

217001–217100 

|-bgcolor=#E9E9E9
| 217001 ||  || — || September 24, 2000 || Socorro || LINEAR || DOR || align=right | 3.1 km || 
|-id=002 bgcolor=#E9E9E9
| 217002 ||  || — || September 22, 2000 || Socorro || LINEAR || — || align=right | 4.3 km || 
|-id=003 bgcolor=#E9E9E9
| 217003 ||  || — || September 23, 2000 || Socorro || LINEAR || — || align=right | 3.2 km || 
|-id=004 bgcolor=#E9E9E9
| 217004 ||  || — || September 24, 2000 || Socorro || LINEAR || — || align=right | 3.1 km || 
|-id=005 bgcolor=#E9E9E9
| 217005 ||  || — || September 24, 2000 || Socorro || LINEAR || AGN || align=right | 2.0 km || 
|-id=006 bgcolor=#E9E9E9
| 217006 ||  || — || October 24, 2000 || Socorro || LINEAR || — || align=right | 3.1 km || 
|-id=007 bgcolor=#d6d6d6
| 217007 ||  || — || November 20, 2000 || Socorro || LINEAR || THB || align=right | 5.3 km || 
|-id=008 bgcolor=#E9E9E9
| 217008 ||  || — || November 17, 2000 || Kitt Peak || Spacewatch || — || align=right | 2.2 km || 
|-id=009 bgcolor=#E9E9E9
| 217009 ||  || — || December 1, 2000 || Socorro || LINEAR || ADE || align=right | 3.2 km || 
|-id=010 bgcolor=#d6d6d6
| 217010 ||  || — || December 4, 2000 || Socorro || LINEAR || — || align=right | 7.3 km || 
|-id=011 bgcolor=#fefefe
| 217011 ||  || — || December 30, 2000 || Socorro || LINEAR || — || align=right | 1.5 km || 
|-id=012 bgcolor=#d6d6d6
| 217012 ||  || — || December 30, 2000 || Socorro || LINEAR || YAK || align=right | 4.7 km || 
|-id=013 bgcolor=#FFC2E0
| 217013 ||  || — || January 4, 2001 || Socorro || LINEAR || AMOcritical || align=right data-sort-value="0.65" | 650 m || 
|-id=014 bgcolor=#fefefe
| 217014 ||  || — || January 16, 2001 || Haleakala || NEAT || PHO || align=right | 2.4 km || 
|-id=015 bgcolor=#d6d6d6
| 217015 ||  || — || January 20, 2001 || Socorro || LINEAR || — || align=right | 6.3 km || 
|-id=016 bgcolor=#E9E9E9
| 217016 ||  || — || January 18, 2001 || Haleakala || NEAT || — || align=right | 2.8 km || 
|-id=017 bgcolor=#E9E9E9
| 217017 ||  || — || February 16, 2001 || Socorro || LINEAR || — || align=right | 2.1 km || 
|-id=018 bgcolor=#fefefe
| 217018 ||  || — || March 18, 2001 || Anderson Mesa || LONEOS || NYS || align=right data-sort-value="0.92" | 920 m || 
|-id=019 bgcolor=#fefefe
| 217019 ||  || — || May 17, 2001 || Socorro || LINEAR || NYS || align=right | 1.1 km || 
|-id=020 bgcolor=#fefefe
| 217020 ||  || — || May 17, 2001 || Socorro || LINEAR || NYS || align=right | 1.3 km || 
|-id=021 bgcolor=#fefefe
| 217021 ||  || — || May 24, 2001 || Socorro || LINEAR || — || align=right | 2.4 km || 
|-id=022 bgcolor=#fefefe
| 217022 ||  || — || May 29, 2001 || Haleakala || NEAT || — || align=right | 1.3 km || 
|-id=023 bgcolor=#d6d6d6
| 217023 ||  || — || June 27, 2001 || Palomar || NEAT || HIL3:2 || align=right | 9.0 km || 
|-id=024 bgcolor=#d6d6d6
| 217024 ||  || — || July 14, 2001 || Haleakala || NEAT || 3:2 || align=right | 7.2 km || 
|-id=025 bgcolor=#FA8072
| 217025 ||  || — || July 20, 2001 || Socorro || LINEAR || — || align=right | 1.9 km || 
|-id=026 bgcolor=#E9E9E9
| 217026 ||  || — || July 23, 2001 || Palomar || NEAT || — || align=right | 1.7 km || 
|-id=027 bgcolor=#fefefe
| 217027 ||  || — || July 26, 2001 || Palomar || NEAT || H || align=right data-sort-value="0.99" | 990 m || 
|-id=028 bgcolor=#E9E9E9
| 217028 ||  || — || July 29, 2001 || Palomar || NEAT || — || align=right | 1.6 km || 
|-id=029 bgcolor=#E9E9E9
| 217029 ||  || — || July 31, 2001 || Palomar || NEAT || MAR || align=right | 1.5 km || 
|-id=030 bgcolor=#E9E9E9
| 217030 ||  || — || July 25, 2001 || Haleakala || NEAT || — || align=right | 1.2 km || 
|-id=031 bgcolor=#fefefe
| 217031 ||  || — || July 21, 2001 || Kitt Peak || Spacewatch || LCI || align=right | 1.3 km || 
|-id=032 bgcolor=#d6d6d6
| 217032 ||  || — || August 7, 2001 || Haleakala || NEAT || HIL3:2 || align=right | 9.0 km || 
|-id=033 bgcolor=#E9E9E9
| 217033 ||  || — || August 11, 2001 || Haleakala || NEAT || — || align=right | 1.3 km || 
|-id=034 bgcolor=#E9E9E9
| 217034 ||  || — || August 14, 2001 || Haleakala || NEAT || — || align=right | 1.9 km || 
|-id=035 bgcolor=#E9E9E9
| 217035 ||  || — || August 13, 2001 || Haleakala || NEAT || — || align=right | 1.5 km || 
|-id=036 bgcolor=#E9E9E9
| 217036 ||  || — || August 16, 2001 || Socorro || LINEAR || — || align=right | 1.6 km || 
|-id=037 bgcolor=#fefefe
| 217037 ||  || — || August 16, 2001 || Socorro || LINEAR || FLO || align=right data-sort-value="0.98" | 980 m || 
|-id=038 bgcolor=#E9E9E9
| 217038 ||  || — || August 16, 2001 || Socorro || LINEAR || — || align=right | 1.3 km || 
|-id=039 bgcolor=#d6d6d6
| 217039 ||  || — || August 16, 2001 || Socorro || LINEAR || SHU3:2 || align=right | 9.7 km || 
|-id=040 bgcolor=#fefefe
| 217040 ||  || — || August 19, 2001 || Socorro || LINEAR || H || align=right | 1.2 km || 
|-id=041 bgcolor=#E9E9E9
| 217041 ||  || — || August 17, 2001 || Socorro || LINEAR || — || align=right | 1.4 km || 
|-id=042 bgcolor=#E9E9E9
| 217042 ||  || — || August 20, 2001 || Socorro || LINEAR || — || align=right | 1.6 km || 
|-id=043 bgcolor=#E9E9E9
| 217043 ||  || — || August 20, 2001 || Socorro || LINEAR || — || align=right | 1.7 km || 
|-id=044 bgcolor=#E9E9E9
| 217044 ||  || — || August 22, 2001 || Socorro || LINEAR || — || align=right | 1.7 km || 
|-id=045 bgcolor=#E9E9E9
| 217045 ||  || — || August 20, 2001 || Palomar || NEAT || — || align=right | 1.8 km || 
|-id=046 bgcolor=#E9E9E9
| 217046 ||  || — || August 26, 2001 || Socorro || LINEAR || — || align=right | 3.6 km || 
|-id=047 bgcolor=#E9E9E9
| 217047 ||  || — || August 22, 2001 || Socorro || LINEAR || EUN || align=right | 1.9 km || 
|-id=048 bgcolor=#E9E9E9
| 217048 ||  || — || August 22, 2001 || Socorro || LINEAR || — || align=right | 2.1 km || 
|-id=049 bgcolor=#E9E9E9
| 217049 ||  || — || August 22, 2001 || Socorro || LINEAR || — || align=right | 2.0 km || 
|-id=050 bgcolor=#E9E9E9
| 217050 ||  || — || August 23, 2001 || Anderson Mesa || LONEOS || MAR || align=right | 1.8 km || 
|-id=051 bgcolor=#E9E9E9
| 217051 ||  || — || August 24, 2001 || Socorro || LINEAR || — || align=right | 1.3 km || 
|-id=052 bgcolor=#E9E9E9
| 217052 ||  || — || August 24, 2001 || Socorro || LINEAR || MAR || align=right | 1.9 km || 
|-id=053 bgcolor=#E9E9E9
| 217053 ||  || — || August 24, 2001 || Socorro || LINEAR || — || align=right | 2.0 km || 
|-id=054 bgcolor=#fefefe
| 217054 ||  || — || August 25, 2001 || Socorro || LINEAR || — || align=right | 1.3 km || 
|-id=055 bgcolor=#E9E9E9
| 217055 ||  || — || August 26, 2001 || Socorro || LINEAR || — || align=right | 1.9 km || 
|-id=056 bgcolor=#E9E9E9
| 217056 ||  || — || August 19, 2001 || Socorro || LINEAR || EUN || align=right | 2.3 km || 
|-id=057 bgcolor=#E9E9E9
| 217057 ||  || — || September 8, 2001 || Socorro || LINEAR || — || align=right | 1.2 km || 
|-id=058 bgcolor=#E9E9E9
| 217058 ||  || — || September 12, 2001 || Socorro || LINEAR || — || align=right | 1.3 km || 
|-id=059 bgcolor=#E9E9E9
| 217059 ||  || — || September 10, 2001 || Socorro || LINEAR || — || align=right | 1.2 km || 
|-id=060 bgcolor=#fefefe
| 217060 ||  || — || September 12, 2001 || Socorro || LINEAR || PHO || align=right | 3.4 km || 
|-id=061 bgcolor=#E9E9E9
| 217061 ||  || — || September 12, 2001 || Socorro || LINEAR || — || align=right | 1.2 km || 
|-id=062 bgcolor=#E9E9E9
| 217062 ||  || — || September 12, 2001 || Socorro || LINEAR || — || align=right | 1.9 km || 
|-id=063 bgcolor=#E9E9E9
| 217063 ||  || — || September 12, 2001 || Socorro || LINEAR || — || align=right | 1.5 km || 
|-id=064 bgcolor=#E9E9E9
| 217064 ||  || — || September 16, 2001 || Socorro || LINEAR || — || align=right | 1.5 km || 
|-id=065 bgcolor=#E9E9E9
| 217065 ||  || — || September 16, 2001 || Socorro || LINEAR || — || align=right | 2.0 km || 
|-id=066 bgcolor=#E9E9E9
| 217066 ||  || — || September 16, 2001 || Socorro || LINEAR || — || align=right | 1.5 km || 
|-id=067 bgcolor=#E9E9E9
| 217067 ||  || — || September 17, 2001 || Socorro || LINEAR || — || align=right | 1.5 km || 
|-id=068 bgcolor=#E9E9E9
| 217068 ||  || — || September 17, 2001 || Socorro || LINEAR || — || align=right | 1.6 km || 
|-id=069 bgcolor=#E9E9E9
| 217069 ||  || — || September 20, 2001 || Socorro || LINEAR || — || align=right | 2.4 km || 
|-id=070 bgcolor=#E9E9E9
| 217070 ||  || — || September 16, 2001 || Socorro || LINEAR || — || align=right | 1.1 km || 
|-id=071 bgcolor=#E9E9E9
| 217071 ||  || — || September 16, 2001 || Socorro || LINEAR || — || align=right | 1.3 km || 
|-id=072 bgcolor=#E9E9E9
| 217072 ||  || — || September 24, 2001 || Socorro || LINEAR || GER || align=right | 2.2 km || 
|-id=073 bgcolor=#E9E9E9
| 217073 ||  || — || September 26, 2001 || Socorro || LINEAR || — || align=right | 2.6 km || 
|-id=074 bgcolor=#fefefe
| 217074 ||  || — || September 26, 2001 || Socorro || LINEAR || H || align=right | 1.0 km || 
|-id=075 bgcolor=#E9E9E9
| 217075 ||  || — || September 29, 2001 || Palomar || NEAT || ADE || align=right | 2.8 km || 
|-id=076 bgcolor=#E9E9E9
| 217076 ||  || — || September 25, 2001 || Socorro || LINEAR || — || align=right | 1.9 km || 
|-id=077 bgcolor=#E9E9E9
| 217077 ||  || — || October 14, 2001 || Socorro || LINEAR || ADE || align=right | 3.6 km || 
|-id=078 bgcolor=#E9E9E9
| 217078 ||  || — || October 14, 2001 || Socorro || LINEAR || — || align=right | 4.5 km || 
|-id=079 bgcolor=#E9E9E9
| 217079 ||  || — || October 13, 2001 || Socorro || LINEAR || — || align=right | 1.7 km || 
|-id=080 bgcolor=#E9E9E9
| 217080 ||  || — || October 13, 2001 || Socorro || LINEAR || — || align=right | 3.2 km || 
|-id=081 bgcolor=#E9E9E9
| 217081 ||  || — || October 15, 2001 || Socorro || LINEAR || — || align=right | 2.1 km || 
|-id=082 bgcolor=#E9E9E9
| 217082 ||  || — || October 13, 2001 || Kitt Peak || Spacewatch || — || align=right | 1.6 km || 
|-id=083 bgcolor=#E9E9E9
| 217083 ||  || — || October 11, 2001 || Palomar || NEAT || — || align=right | 1.8 km || 
|-id=084 bgcolor=#E9E9E9
| 217084 ||  || — || October 12, 2001 || Haleakala || NEAT || — || align=right | 1.7 km || 
|-id=085 bgcolor=#E9E9E9
| 217085 ||  || — || October 15, 2001 || Palomar || NEAT || RAF || align=right | 1.3 km || 
|-id=086 bgcolor=#E9E9E9
| 217086 ||  || — || October 14, 2001 || Socorro || LINEAR || AER || align=right | 1.7 km || 
|-id=087 bgcolor=#E9E9E9
| 217087 ||  || — || October 20, 2001 || Socorro || LINEAR || KON || align=right | 2.9 km || 
|-id=088 bgcolor=#E9E9E9
| 217088 ||  || — || October 22, 2001 || Socorro || LINEAR || ADE || align=right | 2.6 km || 
|-id=089 bgcolor=#E9E9E9
| 217089 ||  || — || November 9, 2001 || Socorro || LINEAR || ADE || align=right | 2.8 km || 
|-id=090 bgcolor=#E9E9E9
| 217090 ||  || — || November 9, 2001 || Socorro || LINEAR || EUN || align=right | 2.2 km || 
|-id=091 bgcolor=#E9E9E9
| 217091 ||  || — || November 10, 2001 || Socorro || LINEAR || RAF || align=right | 1.8 km || 
|-id=092 bgcolor=#fefefe
| 217092 ||  || — || November 10, 2001 || Socorro || LINEAR || — || align=right | 1.7 km || 
|-id=093 bgcolor=#d6d6d6
| 217093 ||  || — || November 10, 2001 || Palomar || NEAT || — || align=right | 5.1 km || 
|-id=094 bgcolor=#E9E9E9
| 217094 ||  || — || November 15, 2001 || Socorro || LINEAR || — || align=right | 2.6 km || 
|-id=095 bgcolor=#E9E9E9
| 217095 ||  || — || November 12, 2001 || Socorro || LINEAR || — || align=right | 1.7 km || 
|-id=096 bgcolor=#E9E9E9
| 217096 ||  || — || November 11, 2001 || Anderson Mesa || LONEOS || — || align=right | 11 km || 
|-id=097 bgcolor=#E9E9E9
| 217097 ||  || — || November 17, 2001 || Socorro || LINEAR || — || align=right | 2.3 km || 
|-id=098 bgcolor=#E9E9E9
| 217098 ||  || — || November 17, 2001 || Socorro || LINEAR || EUN || align=right | 2.2 km || 
|-id=099 bgcolor=#E9E9E9
| 217099 ||  || — || November 20, 2001 || Socorro || LINEAR || — || align=right | 1.9 km || 
|-id=100 bgcolor=#E9E9E9
| 217100 ||  || — || December 9, 2001 || Socorro || LINEAR || — || align=right | 2.4 km || 
|}

217101–217200 

|-bgcolor=#E9E9E9
| 217101 ||  || — || December 11, 2001 || Socorro || LINEAR || — || align=right | 2.5 km || 
|-id=102 bgcolor=#E9E9E9
| 217102 ||  || — || December 9, 2001 || Socorro || LINEAR || — || align=right | 3.0 km || 
|-id=103 bgcolor=#E9E9E9
| 217103 ||  || — || December 10, 2001 || Socorro || LINEAR || ADE || align=right | 4.8 km || 
|-id=104 bgcolor=#E9E9E9
| 217104 ||  || — || December 11, 2001 || Socorro || LINEAR || — || align=right | 2.0 km || 
|-id=105 bgcolor=#FA8072
| 217105 ||  || — || December 10, 2001 || Socorro || LINEAR || — || align=right | 2.3 km || 
|-id=106 bgcolor=#E9E9E9
| 217106 ||  || — || December 10, 2001 || Socorro || LINEAR || — || align=right | 2.0 km || 
|-id=107 bgcolor=#E9E9E9
| 217107 ||  || — || December 14, 2001 || Socorro || LINEAR || HEN || align=right | 1.4 km || 
|-id=108 bgcolor=#E9E9E9
| 217108 ||  || — || December 14, 2001 || Socorro || LINEAR || — || align=right | 1.6 km || 
|-id=109 bgcolor=#E9E9E9
| 217109 ||  || — || December 14, 2001 || Socorro || LINEAR || — || align=right | 3.1 km || 
|-id=110 bgcolor=#fefefe
| 217110 ||  || — || December 17, 2001 || Socorro || LINEAR || — || align=right data-sort-value="0.99" | 990 m || 
|-id=111 bgcolor=#E9E9E9
| 217111 ||  || — || December 18, 2001 || Socorro || LINEAR || ADE || align=right | 3.8 km || 
|-id=112 bgcolor=#E9E9E9
| 217112 ||  || — || December 17, 2001 || Socorro || LINEAR || GER || align=right | 1.9 km || 
|-id=113 bgcolor=#E9E9E9
| 217113 ||  || — || December 17, 2001 || Socorro || LINEAR || EUN || align=right | 2.2 km || 
|-id=114 bgcolor=#E9E9E9
| 217114 ||  || — || December 17, 2001 || Socorro || LINEAR || — || align=right | 2.2 km || 
|-id=115 bgcolor=#fefefe
| 217115 ||  || — || December 18, 2001 || Socorro || LINEAR || — || align=right | 1.5 km || 
|-id=116 bgcolor=#E9E9E9
| 217116 ||  || — || December 20, 2001 || Socorro || LINEAR || — || align=right | 2.8 km || 
|-id=117 bgcolor=#E9E9E9
| 217117 ||  || — || December 24, 2001 || Haleakala || NEAT || — || align=right | 3.7 km || 
|-id=118 bgcolor=#E9E9E9
| 217118 ||  || — || December 20, 2001 || Palomar || NEAT || GEF || align=right | 2.9 km || 
|-id=119 bgcolor=#E9E9E9
| 217119 ||  || — || January 10, 2002 || Campo Imperatore || CINEOS || GEF || align=right | 1.7 km || 
|-id=120 bgcolor=#E9E9E9
| 217120 ||  || — || February 5, 2002 || Palomar || NEAT || — || align=right | 2.0 km || 
|-id=121 bgcolor=#d6d6d6
| 217121 ||  || — || February 8, 2002 || Socorro || LINEAR || EUP || align=right | 6.4 km || 
|-id=122 bgcolor=#fefefe
| 217122 ||  || — || February 8, 2002 || Socorro || LINEAR || — || align=right | 1.9 km || 
|-id=123 bgcolor=#E9E9E9
| 217123 ||  || — || February 4, 2002 || Palomar || NEAT || — || align=right | 3.6 km || 
|-id=124 bgcolor=#d6d6d6
| 217124 ||  || — || February 6, 2002 || Kitt Peak || M. W. Buie || KOR || align=right | 1.8 km || 
|-id=125 bgcolor=#fefefe
| 217125 ||  || — || February 7, 2002 || Kitt Peak || Spacewatch || MAS || align=right data-sort-value="0.86" | 860 m || 
|-id=126 bgcolor=#d6d6d6
| 217126 ||  || — || February 10, 2002 || Socorro || LINEAR || — || align=right | 4.6 km || 
|-id=127 bgcolor=#E9E9E9
| 217127 ||  || — || February 22, 2002 || Socorro || LINEAR || HNS || align=right | 2.1 km || 
|-id=128 bgcolor=#d6d6d6
| 217128 ||  || — || February 16, 2002 || Palomar || NEAT || — || align=right | 4.1 km || 
|-id=129 bgcolor=#fefefe
| 217129 ||  || — || March 11, 2002 || Palomar || NEAT || KLI || align=right | 3.0 km || 
|-id=130 bgcolor=#fefefe
| 217130 ||  || — || March 9, 2002 || Palomar || NEAT || — || align=right | 1.3 km || 
|-id=131 bgcolor=#fefefe
| 217131 ||  || — || March 9, 2002 || Kitt Peak || Spacewatch || NYS || align=right data-sort-value="0.86" | 860 m || 
|-id=132 bgcolor=#d6d6d6
| 217132 ||  || — || March 13, 2002 || Kitt Peak || Spacewatch || — || align=right | 4.8 km || 
|-id=133 bgcolor=#d6d6d6
| 217133 ||  || — || March 18, 2002 || Socorro || LINEAR || — || align=right | 4.7 km || 
|-id=134 bgcolor=#fefefe
| 217134 ||  || — || April 8, 2002 || Palomar || NEAT || — || align=right | 1.00 km || 
|-id=135 bgcolor=#d6d6d6
| 217135 ||  || — || April 10, 2002 || Socorro || LINEAR || — || align=right | 4.9 km || 
|-id=136 bgcolor=#fefefe
| 217136 ||  || — || April 11, 2002 || Palomar || NEAT || — || align=right | 1.2 km || 
|-id=137 bgcolor=#fefefe
| 217137 ||  || — || April 12, 2002 || Socorro || LINEAR || FLO || align=right data-sort-value="0.71" | 710 m || 
|-id=138 bgcolor=#d6d6d6
| 217138 ||  || — || April 13, 2002 || Palomar || NEAT || — || align=right | 5.1 km || 
|-id=139 bgcolor=#fefefe
| 217139 ||  || — || April 9, 2002 || Socorro || LINEAR || FLO || align=right data-sort-value="0.88" | 880 m || 
|-id=140 bgcolor=#d6d6d6
| 217140 ||  || — || April 3, 2002 || Palomar || M. White, M. Collins || VER || align=right | 4.1 km || 
|-id=141 bgcolor=#d6d6d6
| 217141 ||  || — || April 12, 2002 || Palomar || NEAT || — || align=right | 4.1 km || 
|-id=142 bgcolor=#fefefe
| 217142 ||  || — || May 9, 2002 || Socorro || LINEAR || — || align=right | 1.0 km || 
|-id=143 bgcolor=#fefefe
| 217143 ||  || — || June 5, 2002 || Socorro || LINEAR || — || align=right data-sort-value="0.99" | 990 m || 
|-id=144 bgcolor=#fefefe
| 217144 ||  || — || June 12, 2002 || Palomar || NEAT || — || align=right | 1.1 km || 
|-id=145 bgcolor=#FA8072
| 217145 ||  || — || June 16, 2002 || Palomar || NEAT || — || align=right | 1.2 km || 
|-id=146 bgcolor=#fefefe
| 217146 ||  || — || July 1, 2002 || Palomar || NEAT || — || align=right data-sort-value="0.97" | 970 m || 
|-id=147 bgcolor=#fefefe
| 217147 ||  || — || July 9, 2002 || Socorro || LINEAR || — || align=right | 2.3 km || 
|-id=148 bgcolor=#fefefe
| 217148 ||  || — || July 9, 2002 || Socorro || LINEAR || PHO || align=right | 1.5 km || 
|-id=149 bgcolor=#fefefe
| 217149 ||  || — || July 9, 2002 || Socorro || LINEAR || FLO || align=right | 1.0 km || 
|-id=150 bgcolor=#fefefe
| 217150 ||  || — || July 14, 2002 || Socorro || LINEAR || — || align=right | 1.2 km || 
|-id=151 bgcolor=#fefefe
| 217151 ||  || — || July 14, 2002 || Palomar || NEAT || — || align=right | 1.0 km || 
|-id=152 bgcolor=#fefefe
| 217152 ||  || — || July 3, 2002 || Palomar || NEAT || V || align=right data-sort-value="0.89" | 890 m || 
|-id=153 bgcolor=#fefefe
| 217153 ||  || — || July 18, 2002 || Socorro || LINEAR || — || align=right | 1.1 km || 
|-id=154 bgcolor=#fefefe
| 217154 ||  || — || July 29, 2002 || Palomar || NEAT || — || align=right | 1.4 km || 
|-id=155 bgcolor=#fefefe
| 217155 ||  || — || July 17, 2002 || Palomar || NEAT || FLO || align=right data-sort-value="0.64" | 640 m || 
|-id=156 bgcolor=#E9E9E9
| 217156 ||  || — || August 6, 2002 || Palomar || NEAT || — || align=right | 3.0 km || 
|-id=157 bgcolor=#fefefe
| 217157 ||  || — || August 6, 2002 || Palomar || NEAT || V || align=right | 1.00 km || 
|-id=158 bgcolor=#fefefe
| 217158 ||  || — || August 6, 2002 || Palomar || NEAT || FLO || align=right | 1.1 km || 
|-id=159 bgcolor=#fefefe
| 217159 ||  || — || August 12, 2002 || Socorro || LINEAR || FLO || align=right data-sort-value="0.83" | 830 m || 
|-id=160 bgcolor=#FA8072
| 217160 ||  || — || August 10, 2002 || Socorro || LINEAR || — || align=right | 1.2 km || 
|-id=161 bgcolor=#fefefe
| 217161 ||  || — || August 12, 2002 || Socorro || LINEAR || FLO || align=right | 1.0 km || 
|-id=162 bgcolor=#fefefe
| 217162 ||  || — || August 14, 2002 || Socorro || LINEAR || — || align=right | 1.3 km || 
|-id=163 bgcolor=#fefefe
| 217163 ||  || — || August 12, 2002 || Socorro || LINEAR || — || align=right | 1.00 km || 
|-id=164 bgcolor=#fefefe
| 217164 ||  || — || August 14, 2002 || Kitt Peak || Spacewatch || FLO || align=right data-sort-value="0.88" | 880 m || 
|-id=165 bgcolor=#fefefe
| 217165 ||  || — || August 14, 2002 || Socorro || LINEAR || NYS || align=right | 1.1 km || 
|-id=166 bgcolor=#fefefe
| 217166 ||  || — || August 12, 2002 || Socorro || LINEAR || PHO || align=right | 1.7 km || 
|-id=167 bgcolor=#d6d6d6
| 217167 ||  || — || August 8, 2002 || Palomar || S. F. Hönig || THM || align=right | 3.4 km || 
|-id=168 bgcolor=#fefefe
| 217168 ||  || — || August 16, 2002 || Palomar || NEAT || V || align=right | 1.0 km || 
|-id=169 bgcolor=#fefefe
| 217169 ||  || — || August 19, 2002 || Kvistaberg || UDAS || V || align=right data-sort-value="0.77" | 770 m || 
|-id=170 bgcolor=#fefefe
| 217170 ||  || — || August 29, 2002 || Palomar || NEAT || — || align=right data-sort-value="0.94" | 940 m || 
|-id=171 bgcolor=#fefefe
| 217171 ||  || — || August 19, 2002 || Palomar || NEAT || V || align=right data-sort-value="0.67" | 670 m || 
|-id=172 bgcolor=#fefefe
| 217172 ||  || — || August 17, 2002 || Palomar || NEAT || — || align=right data-sort-value="0.93" | 930 m || 
|-id=173 bgcolor=#fefefe
| 217173 ||  || — || August 18, 2002 || Palomar || NEAT || V || align=right data-sort-value="0.69" | 690 m || 
|-id=174 bgcolor=#fefefe
| 217174 ||  || — || September 4, 2002 || Anderson Mesa || LONEOS || V || align=right data-sort-value="0.85" | 850 m || 
|-id=175 bgcolor=#fefefe
| 217175 ||  || — || September 5, 2002 || Socorro || LINEAR || — || align=right data-sort-value="0.96" | 960 m || 
|-id=176 bgcolor=#fefefe
| 217176 ||  || — || September 5, 2002 || Anderson Mesa || LONEOS || ERI || align=right | 1.9 km || 
|-id=177 bgcolor=#fefefe
| 217177 ||  || — || September 5, 2002 || Anderson Mesa || LONEOS || V || align=right | 1.1 km || 
|-id=178 bgcolor=#fefefe
| 217178 ||  || — || September 4, 2002 || Anderson Mesa || LONEOS || FLO || align=right data-sort-value="0.97" | 970 m || 
|-id=179 bgcolor=#fefefe
| 217179 ||  || — || September 5, 2002 || Socorro || LINEAR || — || align=right | 1.0 km || 
|-id=180 bgcolor=#fefefe
| 217180 ||  || — || September 5, 2002 || Socorro || LINEAR || — || align=right | 1.2 km || 
|-id=181 bgcolor=#fefefe
| 217181 ||  || — || September 5, 2002 || Socorro || LINEAR || NYS || align=right | 1.0 km || 
|-id=182 bgcolor=#fefefe
| 217182 ||  || — || September 5, 2002 || Socorro || LINEAR || — || align=right | 3.1 km || 
|-id=183 bgcolor=#fefefe
| 217183 ||  || — || September 13, 2002 || Palomar || NEAT || — || align=right | 1.5 km || 
|-id=184 bgcolor=#fefefe
| 217184 ||  || — || September 14, 2002 || Palomar || NEAT || — || align=right | 1.2 km || 
|-id=185 bgcolor=#fefefe
| 217185 ||  || — || September 13, 2002 || Palomar || NEAT || V || align=right | 1.1 km || 
|-id=186 bgcolor=#fefefe
| 217186 ||  || — || September 14, 2002 || Palomar || NEAT || NYS || align=right data-sort-value="0.88" | 880 m || 
|-id=187 bgcolor=#fefefe
| 217187 ||  || — || September 26, 2002 || Haleakala || NEAT || ERI || align=right | 2.5 km || 
|-id=188 bgcolor=#fefefe
| 217188 ||  || — || September 27, 2002 || Palomar || NEAT || MAS || align=right | 1.2 km || 
|-id=189 bgcolor=#fefefe
| 217189 ||  || — || September 30, 2002 || Socorro || LINEAR || — || align=right | 1.5 km || 
|-id=190 bgcolor=#fefefe
| 217190 ||  || — || September 16, 2002 || Palomar || NEAT || V || align=right data-sort-value="0.89" | 890 m || 
|-id=191 bgcolor=#fefefe
| 217191 ||  || — || October 1, 2002 || Anderson Mesa || LONEOS || — || align=right | 1.2 km || 
|-id=192 bgcolor=#fefefe
| 217192 ||  || — || October 2, 2002 || Socorro || LINEAR || NYS || align=right | 1.0 km || 
|-id=193 bgcolor=#d6d6d6
| 217193 ||  || — || October 3, 2002 || Campo Imperatore || CINEOS || EOS || align=right | 3.3 km || 
|-id=194 bgcolor=#fefefe
| 217194 ||  || — || October 3, 2002 || Palomar || NEAT || V || align=right | 1.2 km || 
|-id=195 bgcolor=#fefefe
| 217195 ||  || — || October 2, 2002 || Haleakala || NEAT || — || align=right | 1.1 km || 
|-id=196 bgcolor=#d6d6d6
| 217196 ||  || — || October 2, 2002 || Campo Imperatore || CINEOS || HIL3:2 || align=right | 7.3 km || 
|-id=197 bgcolor=#d6d6d6
| 217197 ||  || — || October 4, 2002 || Palomar || NEAT || — || align=right | 5.8 km || 
|-id=198 bgcolor=#fefefe
| 217198 ||  || — || October 4, 2002 || Socorro || LINEAR || — || align=right | 1.7 km || 
|-id=199 bgcolor=#fefefe
| 217199 ||  || — || October 5, 2002 || Palomar || NEAT || — || align=right | 1.2 km || 
|-id=200 bgcolor=#fefefe
| 217200 ||  || — || October 3, 2002 || Palomar || NEAT || — || align=right | 1.9 km || 
|}

217201–217300 

|-bgcolor=#fefefe
| 217201 ||  || — || October 4, 2002 || Socorro || LINEAR || — || align=right | 1.4 km || 
|-id=202 bgcolor=#fefefe
| 217202 ||  || — || October 5, 2002 || Socorro || LINEAR || V || align=right | 1.1 km || 
|-id=203 bgcolor=#fefefe
| 217203 ||  || — || October 7, 2002 || Socorro || LINEAR || NYS || align=right | 1.1 km || 
|-id=204 bgcolor=#fefefe
| 217204 ||  || — || October 5, 2002 || Socorro || LINEAR || — || align=right | 1.5 km || 
|-id=205 bgcolor=#fefefe
| 217205 ||  || — || October 7, 2002 || Socorro || LINEAR || — || align=right | 1.2 km || 
|-id=206 bgcolor=#fefefe
| 217206 ||  || — || October 8, 2002 || Anderson Mesa || LONEOS || NYS || align=right data-sort-value="0.82" | 820 m || 
|-id=207 bgcolor=#E9E9E9
| 217207 ||  || — || October 6, 2002 || Socorro || LINEAR || JNS || align=right | 4.6 km || 
|-id=208 bgcolor=#d6d6d6
| 217208 ||  || — || October 9, 2002 || Socorro || LINEAR || SHU3:2 || align=right | 8.2 km || 
|-id=209 bgcolor=#fefefe
| 217209 ||  || — || October 10, 2002 || Socorro || LINEAR || — || align=right | 2.3 km || 
|-id=210 bgcolor=#fefefe
| 217210 ||  || — || October 13, 2002 || Palomar || NEAT || — || align=right | 3.6 km || 
|-id=211 bgcolor=#fefefe
| 217211 ||  || — || October 10, 2002 || Apache Point || SDSS || V || align=right data-sort-value="0.70" | 700 m || 
|-id=212 bgcolor=#fefefe
| 217212 ||  || — || October 5, 2002 || Socorro || LINEAR || V || align=right | 1.3 km || 
|-id=213 bgcolor=#fefefe
| 217213 ||  || — || October 28, 2002 || Socorro || LINEAR || — || align=right | 2.3 km || 
|-id=214 bgcolor=#fefefe
| 217214 ||  || — || October 31, 2002 || Socorro || LINEAR || — || align=right | 1.3 km || 
|-id=215 bgcolor=#fefefe
| 217215 ||  || — || October 30, 2002 || Palomar || NEAT || V || align=right | 1.1 km || 
|-id=216 bgcolor=#d6d6d6
| 217216 ||  || — || November 5, 2002 || Socorro || LINEAR || TIR || align=right | 3.9 km || 
|-id=217 bgcolor=#E9E9E9
| 217217 ||  || — || November 5, 2002 || Anderson Mesa || LONEOS || — || align=right | 2.0 km || 
|-id=218 bgcolor=#fefefe
| 217218 ||  || — || November 5, 2002 || Anderson Mesa || LONEOS || NYS || align=right | 1.1 km || 
|-id=219 bgcolor=#fefefe
| 217219 ||  || — || November 5, 2002 || Socorro || LINEAR || V || align=right | 1.4 km || 
|-id=220 bgcolor=#fefefe
| 217220 ||  || — || November 6, 2002 || Haleakala || NEAT || NYS || align=right | 1.1 km || 
|-id=221 bgcolor=#fefefe
| 217221 ||  || — || November 7, 2002 || Socorro || LINEAR || — || align=right | 1.2 km || 
|-id=222 bgcolor=#E9E9E9
| 217222 ||  || — || November 8, 2002 || Socorro || LINEAR || — || align=right | 3.4 km || 
|-id=223 bgcolor=#fefefe
| 217223 ||  || — || November 12, 2002 || Socorro || LINEAR || — || align=right | 1.0 km || 
|-id=224 bgcolor=#E9E9E9
| 217224 ||  || — || December 1, 2002 || Socorro || LINEAR || GEF || align=right | 2.1 km || 
|-id=225 bgcolor=#fefefe
| 217225 ||  || — || December 7, 2002 || Desert Eagle || W. K. Y. Yeung || FLO || align=right data-sort-value="0.98" | 980 m || 
|-id=226 bgcolor=#fefefe
| 217226 ||  || — || December 10, 2002 || Socorro || LINEAR || NYS || align=right | 1.3 km || 
|-id=227 bgcolor=#fefefe
| 217227 ||  || — || December 10, 2002 || Socorro || LINEAR || — || align=right | 1.3 km || 
|-id=228 bgcolor=#fefefe
| 217228 ||  || — || January 7, 2003 || Socorro || LINEAR || H || align=right data-sort-value="0.86" | 860 m || 
|-id=229 bgcolor=#fefefe
| 217229 ||  || — || January 1, 2003 || Socorro || LINEAR || — || align=right | 1.9 km || 
|-id=230 bgcolor=#fefefe
| 217230 ||  || — || January 28, 2003 || Palomar || NEAT || — || align=right | 1.4 km || 
|-id=231 bgcolor=#fefefe
| 217231 ||  || — || January 31, 2003 || Tebbutt || F. B. Zoltowski || — || align=right | 1.8 km || 
|-id=232 bgcolor=#fefefe
| 217232 ||  || — || January 26, 2003 || Kitt Peak || Spacewatch || NYS || align=right data-sort-value="0.97" | 970 m || 
|-id=233 bgcolor=#fefefe
| 217233 ||  || — || January 28, 2003 || Socorro || LINEAR || H || align=right | 1.00 km || 
|-id=234 bgcolor=#fefefe
| 217234 ||  || — || March 9, 2003 || Anderson Mesa || LONEOS || H || align=right | 1.0 km || 
|-id=235 bgcolor=#E9E9E9
| 217235 ||  || — || March 24, 2003 || Kitt Peak || Spacewatch || HEN || align=right | 1.6 km || 
|-id=236 bgcolor=#fefefe
| 217236 ||  || — || March 27, 2003 || Kitt Peak || Spacewatch || — || align=right | 1.5 km || 
|-id=237 bgcolor=#fefefe
| 217237 ||  || — || April 6, 2003 || Anderson Mesa || LONEOS || H || align=right | 1.5 km || 
|-id=238 bgcolor=#d6d6d6
| 217238 ||  || — || April 21, 2003 || Kvistaberg || UDAS || BRA || align=right | 2.2 km || 
|-id=239 bgcolor=#fefefe
| 217239 ||  || — || April 26, 2003 || Kitt Peak || Spacewatch || — || align=right | 1.3 km || 
|-id=240 bgcolor=#d6d6d6
| 217240 ||  || — || April 30, 2003 || Kitt Peak || Spacewatch || — || align=right | 2.9 km || 
|-id=241 bgcolor=#d6d6d6
| 217241 ||  || — || May 25, 2003 || Kitt Peak || Spacewatch || — || align=right | 3.9 km || 
|-id=242 bgcolor=#d6d6d6
| 217242 ||  || — || May 25, 2003 || Goodricke-Pigott || R. A. Tucker || — || align=right | 4.9 km || 
|-id=243 bgcolor=#d6d6d6
| 217243 ||  || — || June 24, 2003 || Anderson Mesa || LONEOS || EUP || align=right | 7.0 km || 
|-id=244 bgcolor=#d6d6d6
| 217244 ||  || — || June 29, 2003 || Socorro || LINEAR || — || align=right | 4.7 km || 
|-id=245 bgcolor=#d6d6d6
| 217245 ||  || — || July 22, 2003 || Palomar || NEAT || — || align=right | 7.2 km || 
|-id=246 bgcolor=#d6d6d6
| 217246 ||  || — || August 5, 2003 || Kitt Peak || Spacewatch || — || align=right | 5.1 km || 
|-id=247 bgcolor=#d6d6d6
| 217247 ||  || — || August 18, 2003 || Campo Imperatore || CINEOS || — || align=right | 2.7 km || 
|-id=248 bgcolor=#d6d6d6
| 217248 ||  || — || September 18, 2003 || Socorro || LINEAR || — || align=right | 4.3 km || 
|-id=249 bgcolor=#d6d6d6
| 217249 ||  || — || September 30, 2003 || Socorro || LINEAR || — || align=right | 5.2 km || 
|-id=250 bgcolor=#fefefe
| 217250 ||  || — || October 14, 2003 || Anderson Mesa || LONEOS || NYS || align=right | 1.1 km || 
|-id=251 bgcolor=#FA8072
| 217251 ||  || — || October 24, 2003 || Socorro || LINEAR || — || align=right | 1.5 km || 
|-id=252 bgcolor=#fefefe
| 217252 ||  || — || October 17, 2003 || Kitt Peak || Spacewatch || — || align=right data-sort-value="0.74" | 740 m || 
|-id=253 bgcolor=#E9E9E9
| 217253 ||  || — || October 19, 2003 || Kitt Peak || Spacewatch || — || align=right | 5.6 km || 
|-id=254 bgcolor=#E9E9E9
| 217254 ||  || — || October 23, 2003 || Anderson Mesa || LONEOS || — || align=right | 2.0 km || 
|-id=255 bgcolor=#fefefe
| 217255 ||  || — || October 30, 2003 || Haleakala || NEAT || — || align=right | 1.4 km || 
|-id=256 bgcolor=#fefefe
| 217256 ||  || — || October 20, 2003 || Socorro || LINEAR || — || align=right | 1.3 km || 
|-id=257 bgcolor=#FA8072
| 217257 Valemangano ||  ||  || November 19, 2003 || Campo Imperatore || CINEOS || — || align=right data-sort-value="0.79" | 790 m || 
|-id=258 bgcolor=#fefefe
| 217258 ||  || — || November 19, 2003 || Kitt Peak || Spacewatch || — || align=right data-sort-value="0.90" | 900 m || 
|-id=259 bgcolor=#d6d6d6
| 217259 ||  || — || November 19, 2003 || Palomar || NEAT || — || align=right | 4.4 km || 
|-id=260 bgcolor=#fefefe
| 217260 ||  || — || November 20, 2003 || Socorro || LINEAR || — || align=right | 1.2 km || 
|-id=261 bgcolor=#fefefe
| 217261 ||  || — || December 1, 2003 || Kitt Peak || Spacewatch || — || align=right | 1.2 km || 
|-id=262 bgcolor=#FA8072
| 217262 ||  || — || December 18, 2003 || Socorro || LINEAR || — || align=right | 1.2 km || 
|-id=263 bgcolor=#fefefe
| 217263 ||  || — || December 18, 2003 || Socorro || LINEAR || V || align=right | 1.2 km || 
|-id=264 bgcolor=#d6d6d6
| 217264 ||  || — || December 19, 2003 || Socorro || LINEAR || — || align=right | 4.3 km || 
|-id=265 bgcolor=#d6d6d6
| 217265 ||  || — || December 20, 2003 || Socorro || LINEAR || EUP || align=right | 8.5 km || 
|-id=266 bgcolor=#fefefe
| 217266 ||  || — || December 19, 2003 || Kitt Peak || Spacewatch || — || align=right data-sort-value="0.94" | 940 m || 
|-id=267 bgcolor=#fefefe
| 217267 ||  || — || December 20, 2003 || Socorro || LINEAR || V || align=right | 1.2 km || 
|-id=268 bgcolor=#fefefe
| 217268 ||  || — || December 18, 2003 || Socorro || LINEAR || FLO || align=right data-sort-value="0.94" | 940 m || 
|-id=269 bgcolor=#fefefe
| 217269 ||  || — || December 19, 2003 || Socorro || LINEAR || — || align=right | 1.7 km || 
|-id=270 bgcolor=#fefefe
| 217270 ||  || — || December 19, 2003 || Socorro || LINEAR || — || align=right | 1.3 km || 
|-id=271 bgcolor=#E9E9E9
| 217271 ||  || — || December 29, 2003 || Socorro || LINEAR || EUN || align=right | 2.0 km || 
|-id=272 bgcolor=#fefefe
| 217272 ||  || — || January 13, 2004 || Anderson Mesa || LONEOS || V || align=right | 1.1 km || 
|-id=273 bgcolor=#fefefe
| 217273 ||  || — || January 17, 2004 || Palomar || NEAT || — || align=right | 2.2 km || 
|-id=274 bgcolor=#fefefe
| 217274 ||  || — || January 21, 2004 || Socorro || LINEAR || V || align=right | 1.4 km || 
|-id=275 bgcolor=#fefefe
| 217275 ||  || — || January 27, 2004 || Kitt Peak || Spacewatch || — || align=right | 1.2 km || 
|-id=276 bgcolor=#fefefe
| 217276 ||  || — || January 16, 2004 || Kitt Peak || Spacewatch || — || align=right data-sort-value="0.96" | 960 m || 
|-id=277 bgcolor=#fefefe
| 217277 ||  || — || February 11, 2004 || Kitt Peak || Spacewatch || — || align=right | 1.1 km || 
|-id=278 bgcolor=#E9E9E9
| 217278 ||  || — || February 18, 2004 || Kitt Peak || Spacewatch || — || align=right | 1.6 km || 
|-id=279 bgcolor=#E9E9E9
| 217279 ||  || — || February 18, 2004 || Catalina || CSS || — || align=right | 4.5 km || 
|-id=280 bgcolor=#fefefe
| 217280 ||  || — || February 17, 2004 || Palomar || NEAT || — || align=right | 1.1 km || 
|-id=281 bgcolor=#d6d6d6
| 217281 ||  || — || February 16, 2004 || Palomar || LINEAR || — || align=right | 6.0 km || 
|-id=282 bgcolor=#E9E9E9
| 217282 ||  || — || March 11, 2004 || Palomar || NEAT || — || align=right | 2.9 km || 
|-id=283 bgcolor=#d6d6d6
| 217283 ||  || — || March 12, 2004 || Palomar || NEAT || — || align=right | 4.7 km || 
|-id=284 bgcolor=#E9E9E9
| 217284 ||  || — || March 11, 2004 || Palomar || NEAT || — || align=right | 2.1 km || 
|-id=285 bgcolor=#fefefe
| 217285 ||  || — || March 15, 2004 || Kitt Peak || Spacewatch || NYS || align=right data-sort-value="0.93" | 930 m || 
|-id=286 bgcolor=#E9E9E9
| 217286 ||  || — || March 17, 2004 || Kitt Peak || Spacewatch || — || align=right | 1.7 km || 
|-id=287 bgcolor=#d6d6d6
| 217287 ||  || — || March 19, 2004 || Socorro || LINEAR || — || align=right | 4.7 km || 
|-id=288 bgcolor=#d6d6d6
| 217288 ||  || — || March 23, 2004 || Socorro || LINEAR || URS || align=right | 6.5 km || 
|-id=289 bgcolor=#E9E9E9
| 217289 ||  || — || March 28, 2004 || Socorro || LINEAR || — || align=right | 3.7 km || 
|-id=290 bgcolor=#E9E9E9
| 217290 ||  || — || March 28, 2004 || Socorro || LINEAR || — || align=right | 2.7 km || 
|-id=291 bgcolor=#E9E9E9
| 217291 ||  || — || April 13, 2004 || Siding Spring || SSS || EUN || align=right | 2.1 km || 
|-id=292 bgcolor=#E9E9E9
| 217292 ||  || — || April 12, 2004 || Palomar || NEAT || — || align=right | 2.9 km || 
|-id=293 bgcolor=#E9E9E9
| 217293 ||  || — || April 13, 2004 || Kitt Peak || Spacewatch || ADE || align=right | 2.6 km || 
|-id=294 bgcolor=#E9E9E9
| 217294 ||  || — || April 15, 2004 || Anderson Mesa || LONEOS || — || align=right | 2.0 km || 
|-id=295 bgcolor=#E9E9E9
| 217295 ||  || — || April 16, 2004 || Palomar || NEAT || — || align=right | 3.3 km || 
|-id=296 bgcolor=#fefefe
| 217296 ||  || — || April 21, 2004 || Socorro || LINEAR || — || align=right | 1.2 km || 
|-id=297 bgcolor=#E9E9E9
| 217297 ||  || — || April 16, 2004 || Socorro || LINEAR || — || align=right | 2.2 km || 
|-id=298 bgcolor=#E9E9E9
| 217298 ||  || — || May 11, 2004 || Siding Spring || SSS || — || align=right | 2.9 km || 
|-id=299 bgcolor=#E9E9E9
| 217299 ||  || — || May 12, 2004 || Catalina || CSS || — || align=right | 3.9 km || 
|-id=300 bgcolor=#E9E9E9
| 217300 ||  || — || May 9, 2004 || Catalina || CSS || — || align=right | 2.8 km || 
|}

217301–217400 

|-bgcolor=#E9E9E9
| 217301 ||  || — || May 9, 2004 || Kitt Peak || Spacewatch || CLO || align=right | 2.9 km || 
|-id=302 bgcolor=#E9E9E9
| 217302 ||  || — || May 9, 2004 || Kitt Peak || Spacewatch || — || align=right | 4.5 km || 
|-id=303 bgcolor=#E9E9E9
| 217303 ||  || — || May 15, 2004 || Socorro || LINEAR || — || align=right | 2.8 km || 
|-id=304 bgcolor=#fefefe
| 217304 ||  || — || May 15, 2004 || Socorro || LINEAR || NYS || align=right data-sort-value="0.89" | 890 m || 
|-id=305 bgcolor=#E9E9E9
| 217305 ||  || — || May 15, 2004 || Socorro || LINEAR || INO || align=right | 1.9 km || 
|-id=306 bgcolor=#E9E9E9
| 217306 ||  || — || June 6, 2004 || Palomar || NEAT || DOR || align=right | 3.8 km || 
|-id=307 bgcolor=#E9E9E9
| 217307 ||  || — || June 9, 2004 || Siding Spring || SSS || ADE || align=right | 3.7 km || 
|-id=308 bgcolor=#d6d6d6
| 217308 ||  || — || June 20, 2004 || Socorro || LINEAR || — || align=right | 5.9 km || 
|-id=309 bgcolor=#fefefe
| 217309 ||  || — || July 14, 2004 || Socorro || LINEAR || — || align=right | 2.3 km || 
|-id=310 bgcolor=#d6d6d6
| 217310 ||  || — || July 14, 2004 || Socorro || LINEAR || BRA || align=right | 2.1 km || 
|-id=311 bgcolor=#d6d6d6
| 217311 ||  || — || July 20, 2004 || Siding Spring || SSS || EUP || align=right | 7.4 km || 
|-id=312 bgcolor=#d6d6d6
| 217312 ||  || — || August 7, 2004 || Palomar || NEAT || — || align=right | 3.4 km || 
|-id=313 bgcolor=#d6d6d6
| 217313 ||  || — || August 7, 2004 || Palomar || NEAT || — || align=right | 3.5 km || 
|-id=314 bgcolor=#d6d6d6
| 217314 ||  || — || August 8, 2004 || Anderson Mesa || LONEOS || ALA || align=right | 4.2 km || 
|-id=315 bgcolor=#fefefe
| 217315 ||  || — || August 9, 2004 || Socorro || LINEAR || H || align=right | 1.1 km || 
|-id=316 bgcolor=#d6d6d6
| 217316 ||  || — || August 8, 2004 || Socorro || LINEAR || — || align=right | 5.1 km || 
|-id=317 bgcolor=#d6d6d6
| 217317 ||  || — || August 9, 2004 || Socorro || LINEAR || — || align=right | 3.6 km || 
|-id=318 bgcolor=#d6d6d6
| 217318 ||  || — || August 5, 2004 || Palomar || NEAT || NAE || align=right | 3.8 km || 
|-id=319 bgcolor=#d6d6d6
| 217319 ||  || — || August 6, 2004 || Palomar || NEAT || — || align=right | 3.7 km || 
|-id=320 bgcolor=#d6d6d6
| 217320 ||  || — || August 9, 2004 || Socorro || LINEAR || — || align=right | 4.6 km || 
|-id=321 bgcolor=#fefefe
| 217321 ||  || — || August 7, 2004 || Campo Imperatore || CINEOS || — || align=right | 1.2 km || 
|-id=322 bgcolor=#d6d6d6
| 217322 ||  || — || August 12, 2004 || Socorro || LINEAR || — || align=right | 6.2 km || 
|-id=323 bgcolor=#d6d6d6
| 217323 ||  || — || August 10, 2004 || Socorro || LINEAR || — || align=right | 4.3 km || 
|-id=324 bgcolor=#d6d6d6
| 217324 ||  || — || August 24, 2004 || Socorro || LINEAR || — || align=right | 6.0 km || 
|-id=325 bgcolor=#d6d6d6
| 217325 ||  || — || September 8, 2004 || Socorro || LINEAR || EOS || align=right | 3.0 km || 
|-id=326 bgcolor=#d6d6d6
| 217326 ||  || — || September 8, 2004 || Socorro || LINEAR || HYG || align=right | 3.6 km || 
|-id=327 bgcolor=#d6d6d6
| 217327 ||  || — || September 8, 2004 || Socorro || LINEAR || THM || align=right | 3.2 km || 
|-id=328 bgcolor=#d6d6d6
| 217328 ||  || — || September 8, 2004 || Socorro || LINEAR || — || align=right | 4.2 km || 
|-id=329 bgcolor=#d6d6d6
| 217329 ||  || — || September 8, 2004 || Socorro || LINEAR || — || align=right | 7.4 km || 
|-id=330 bgcolor=#d6d6d6
| 217330 ||  || — || September 8, 2004 || Socorro || LINEAR || — || align=right | 3.4 km || 
|-id=331 bgcolor=#E9E9E9
| 217331 ||  || — || September 8, 2004 || Socorro || LINEAR || — || align=right | 4.1 km || 
|-id=332 bgcolor=#d6d6d6
| 217332 ||  || — || September 8, 2004 || Uccle || Uccle Obs. || — || align=right | 4.2 km || 
|-id=333 bgcolor=#d6d6d6
| 217333 ||  || — || September 8, 2004 || Socorro || LINEAR || — || align=right | 3.3 km || 
|-id=334 bgcolor=#d6d6d6
| 217334 ||  || — || September 8, 2004 || Palomar || NEAT || — || align=right | 4.7 km || 
|-id=335 bgcolor=#d6d6d6
| 217335 ||  || — || September 7, 2004 || Palomar || NEAT || EOS || align=right | 3.5 km || 
|-id=336 bgcolor=#E9E9E9
| 217336 ||  || — || September 8, 2004 || Socorro || LINEAR || — || align=right | 3.1 km || 
|-id=337 bgcolor=#d6d6d6
| 217337 ||  || — || September 8, 2004 || Socorro || LINEAR || — || align=right | 2.9 km || 
|-id=338 bgcolor=#d6d6d6
| 217338 ||  || — || September 9, 2004 || Socorro || LINEAR || — || align=right | 3.3 km || 
|-id=339 bgcolor=#d6d6d6
| 217339 ||  || — || September 10, 2004 || Socorro || LINEAR || — || align=right | 4.4 km || 
|-id=340 bgcolor=#d6d6d6
| 217340 ||  || — || September 10, 2004 || Socorro || LINEAR || — || align=right | 5.0 km || 
|-id=341 bgcolor=#d6d6d6
| 217341 ||  || — || September 10, 2004 || Socorro || LINEAR || EOS || align=right | 4.2 km || 
|-id=342 bgcolor=#d6d6d6
| 217342 ||  || — || September 10, 2004 || Socorro || LINEAR || HYG || align=right | 3.8 km || 
|-id=343 bgcolor=#d6d6d6
| 217343 ||  || — || September 10, 2004 || Socorro || LINEAR || EOS || align=right | 3.6 km || 
|-id=344 bgcolor=#d6d6d6
| 217344 ||  || — || September 10, 2004 || Socorro || LINEAR || EOS || align=right | 3.3 km || 
|-id=345 bgcolor=#d6d6d6
| 217345 ||  || — || September 10, 2004 || Socorro || LINEAR || EOS || align=right | 3.6 km || 
|-id=346 bgcolor=#d6d6d6
| 217346 ||  || — || September 10, 2004 || Socorro || LINEAR || EOS || align=right | 3.0 km || 
|-id=347 bgcolor=#d6d6d6
| 217347 ||  || — || September 11, 2004 || Socorro || LINEAR || — || align=right | 4.8 km || 
|-id=348 bgcolor=#d6d6d6
| 217348 ||  || — || September 11, 2004 || Socorro || LINEAR || — || align=right | 5.7 km || 
|-id=349 bgcolor=#d6d6d6
| 217349 ||  || — || September 11, 2004 || Socorro || LINEAR || — || align=right | 5.2 km || 
|-id=350 bgcolor=#d6d6d6
| 217350 ||  || — || September 11, 2004 || Socorro || LINEAR || — || align=right | 5.4 km || 
|-id=351 bgcolor=#d6d6d6
| 217351 ||  || — || September 11, 2004 || Socorro || LINEAR || URS || align=right | 5.6 km || 
|-id=352 bgcolor=#d6d6d6
| 217352 ||  || — || September 8, 2004 || Socorro || LINEAR || — || align=right | 2.9 km || 
|-id=353 bgcolor=#d6d6d6
| 217353 ||  || — || September 15, 2004 || Kitt Peak || Spacewatch || — || align=right | 3.1 km || 
|-id=354 bgcolor=#fefefe
| 217354 ||  || — || September 15, 2004 || Socorro || LINEAR || H || align=right | 1.2 km || 
|-id=355 bgcolor=#d6d6d6
| 217355 ||  || — || September 9, 2004 || Socorro || LINEAR || HYG || align=right | 4.5 km || 
|-id=356 bgcolor=#d6d6d6
| 217356 ||  || — || September 11, 2004 || Palomar || NEAT || — || align=right | 5.2 km || 
|-id=357 bgcolor=#d6d6d6
| 217357 ||  || — || September 15, 2004 || Siding Spring || SSS || EOS || align=right | 3.5 km || 
|-id=358 bgcolor=#E9E9E9
| 217358 ||  || — || September 22, 2004 || Desert Eagle || W. K. Y. Yeung || — || align=right | 1.5 km || 
|-id=359 bgcolor=#d6d6d6
| 217359 ||  || — || September 18, 2004 || Socorro || LINEAR || — || align=right | 3.7 km || 
|-id=360 bgcolor=#E9E9E9
| 217360 ||  || — || September 22, 2004 || Socorro || LINEAR || — || align=right | 3.3 km || 
|-id=361 bgcolor=#d6d6d6
| 217361 ||  || — || October 5, 2004 || Socorro || LINEAR || — || align=right | 5.3 km || 
|-id=362 bgcolor=#d6d6d6
| 217362 ||  || — || October 7, 2004 || Kitt Peak || Spacewatch || — || align=right | 3.8 km || 
|-id=363 bgcolor=#d6d6d6
| 217363 ||  || — || October 4, 2004 || Kitt Peak || Spacewatch || HYG || align=right | 3.6 km || 
|-id=364 bgcolor=#d6d6d6
| 217364 ||  || — || October 4, 2004 || Anderson Mesa || LONEOS || — || align=right | 4.7 km || 
|-id=365 bgcolor=#fefefe
| 217365 ||  || — || October 4, 2004 || Anderson Mesa || LONEOS || NYS || align=right | 1.0 km || 
|-id=366 bgcolor=#fefefe
| 217366 Mayalin ||  ||  || October 4, 2004 || Jarnac || Jarnac Obs. || — || align=right | 1.2 km || 
|-id=367 bgcolor=#d6d6d6
| 217367 ||  || — || October 5, 2004 || Anderson Mesa || LONEOS || HYG || align=right | 4.3 km || 
|-id=368 bgcolor=#d6d6d6
| 217368 ||  || — || October 4, 2004 || Anderson Mesa || LONEOS || EOS || align=right | 3.3 km || 
|-id=369 bgcolor=#d6d6d6
| 217369 ||  || — || October 6, 2004 || Kitt Peak || Spacewatch || — || align=right | 3.4 km || 
|-id=370 bgcolor=#d6d6d6
| 217370 ||  || — || October 7, 2004 || Kitt Peak || Spacewatch || — || align=right | 3.0 km || 
|-id=371 bgcolor=#d6d6d6
| 217371 ||  || — || October 7, 2004 || Socorro || LINEAR || — || align=right | 4.5 km || 
|-id=372 bgcolor=#d6d6d6
| 217372 ||  || — || October 8, 2004 || Socorro || LINEAR || TIR || align=right | 3.7 km || 
|-id=373 bgcolor=#d6d6d6
| 217373 ||  || — || October 7, 2004 || Kitt Peak || Spacewatch || TIR || align=right | 5.3 km || 
|-id=374 bgcolor=#d6d6d6
| 217374 ||  || — || October 7, 2004 || Socorro || LINEAR || — || align=right | 4.9 km || 
|-id=375 bgcolor=#d6d6d6
| 217375 ||  || — || October 7, 2004 || Palomar || NEAT || — || align=right | 5.7 km || 
|-id=376 bgcolor=#d6d6d6
| 217376 ||  || — || October 14, 2004 || Anderson Mesa || LONEOS || — || align=right | 4.8 km || 
|-id=377 bgcolor=#d6d6d6
| 217377 ||  || — || October 18, 2004 || Socorro || LINEAR || VER || align=right | 5.1 km || 
|-id=378 bgcolor=#d6d6d6
| 217378 ||  || — || October 18, 2004 || Socorro || LINEAR || ALA || align=right | 5.5 km || 
|-id=379 bgcolor=#d6d6d6
| 217379 ||  || — || October 16, 2004 || Socorro || LINEAR || — || align=right | 6.7 km || 
|-id=380 bgcolor=#d6d6d6
| 217380 ||  || — || November 1, 2004 || Palomar || NEAT || — || align=right | 4.8 km || 
|-id=381 bgcolor=#E9E9E9
| 217381 ||  || — || November 6, 2004 || Socorro || LINEAR || BAR || align=right | 1.6 km || 
|-id=382 bgcolor=#d6d6d6
| 217382 ||  || — || November 9, 2004 || Catalina || CSS || HYG || align=right | 3.9 km || 
|-id=383 bgcolor=#fefefe
| 217383 ||  || — || November 19, 2004 || Socorro || LINEAR || — || align=right | 2.0 km || 
|-id=384 bgcolor=#fefefe
| 217384 ||  || — || December 1, 2004 || Catalina || CSS || H || align=right data-sort-value="0.86" | 860 m || 
|-id=385 bgcolor=#d6d6d6
| 217385 ||  || — || December 1, 2004 || Catalina || CSS || — || align=right | 5.6 km || 
|-id=386 bgcolor=#d6d6d6
| 217386 ||  || — || December 10, 2004 || Anderson Mesa || LONEOS || — || align=right | 4.2 km || 
|-id=387 bgcolor=#fefefe
| 217387 ||  || — || December 14, 2004 || Catalina || CSS || H || align=right | 1.2 km || 
|-id=388 bgcolor=#d6d6d6
| 217388 ||  || — || December 14, 2004 || Socorro || LINEAR || — || align=right | 3.5 km || 
|-id=389 bgcolor=#E9E9E9
| 217389 ||  || — || January 19, 2005 || Socorro || LINEAR || DOR || align=right | 3.3 km || 
|-id=390 bgcolor=#FFC2E0
| 217390 ||  || — || February 5, 2005 || Palomar || NEAT || APOcritical || align=right data-sort-value="0.62" | 620 m || 
|-id=391 bgcolor=#d6d6d6
| 217391 ||  || — || March 3, 2005 || Kitt Peak || Spacewatch || VER || align=right | 4.8 km || 
|-id=392 bgcolor=#fefefe
| 217392 ||  || — || March 4, 2005 || Catalina || CSS || — || align=right | 1.4 km || 
|-id=393 bgcolor=#d6d6d6
| 217393 ||  || — || March 3, 2005 || Catalina || CSS || HYG || align=right | 5.5 km || 
|-id=394 bgcolor=#fefefe
| 217394 ||  || — || March 4, 2005 || Kitt Peak || Spacewatch || FLO || align=right data-sort-value="0.86" | 860 m || 
|-id=395 bgcolor=#fefefe
| 217395 ||  || — || March 8, 2005 || Kitt Peak || Spacewatch || FLO || align=right | 1.2 km || 
|-id=396 bgcolor=#E9E9E9
| 217396 ||  || — || March 12, 2005 || Socorro || LINEAR || — || align=right | 1.7 km || 
|-id=397 bgcolor=#fefefe
| 217397 ||  || — || April 2, 2005 || Mount Lemmon || Mount Lemmon Survey || FLO || align=right | 1.2 km || 
|-id=398 bgcolor=#fefefe
| 217398 Tihany ||  ||  || April 5, 2005 || Piszkéstető || K. Sárneczky || FLO || align=right data-sort-value="0.88" | 880 m || 
|-id=399 bgcolor=#fefefe
| 217399 ||  || — || April 6, 2005 || Kitt Peak || Spacewatch || — || align=right data-sort-value="0.96" | 960 m || 
|-id=400 bgcolor=#E9E9E9
| 217400 ||  || — || April 1, 2005 || Catalina || CSS || — || align=right | 1.8 km || 
|}

217401–217500 

|-bgcolor=#fefefe
| 217401 ||  || — || April 4, 2005 || Mount Lemmon || Mount Lemmon Survey || — || align=right data-sort-value="0.96" | 960 m || 
|-id=402 bgcolor=#fefefe
| 217402 ||  || — || April 30, 2005 || Campo Imperatore || CINEOS || — || align=right | 1.1 km || 
|-id=403 bgcolor=#fefefe
| 217403 ||  || — || May 2, 2005 || Reedy Creek || J. Broughton || — || align=right | 2.8 km || 
|-id=404 bgcolor=#fefefe
| 217404 ||  || — || May 4, 2005 || Kitt Peak || Spacewatch || — || align=right data-sort-value="0.89" | 890 m || 
|-id=405 bgcolor=#fefefe
| 217405 ||  || — || May 8, 2005 || Siding Spring || SSS || NYS || align=right data-sort-value="0.93" | 930 m || 
|-id=406 bgcolor=#fefefe
| 217406 ||  || — || May 10, 2005 || Mount Lemmon || Mount Lemmon Survey || NYS || align=right data-sort-value="0.85" | 850 m || 
|-id=407 bgcolor=#E9E9E9
| 217407 ||  || — || May 11, 2005 || Palomar || NEAT || EUN || align=right | 2.0 km || 
|-id=408 bgcolor=#fefefe
| 217408 ||  || — || May 16, 2005 || Kitt Peak || Spacewatch || V || align=right data-sort-value="0.68" | 680 m || 
|-id=409 bgcolor=#fefefe
| 217409 ||  || — || June 1, 2005 || Kitt Peak || Spacewatch || — || align=right | 1.0 km || 
|-id=410 bgcolor=#E9E9E9
| 217410 ||  || — || June 13, 2005 || Mount Lemmon || Mount Lemmon Survey || — || align=right | 2.7 km || 
|-id=411 bgcolor=#fefefe
| 217411 ||  || — || June 11, 2005 || Catalina || CSS || fast? || align=right | 1.8 km || 
|-id=412 bgcolor=#E9E9E9
| 217412 ||  || — || June 16, 2005 || Catalina || CSS || — || align=right | 2.6 km || 
|-id=413 bgcolor=#fefefe
| 217413 ||  || — || July 3, 2005 || Mount Lemmon || Mount Lemmon Survey || NYS || align=right data-sort-value="0.84" | 840 m || 
|-id=414 bgcolor=#E9E9E9
| 217414 ||  || — || July 7, 2005 || Socorro || LINEAR || — || align=right | 3.2 km || 
|-id=415 bgcolor=#E9E9E9
| 217415 ||  || — || July 29, 2005 || Palomar || NEAT || — || align=right | 2.2 km || 
|-id=416 bgcolor=#E9E9E9
| 217416 ||  || — || August 6, 2005 || Reedy Creek || J. Broughton || — || align=right | 1.7 km || 
|-id=417 bgcolor=#E9E9E9
| 217417 ||  || — || August 24, 2005 || Palomar || NEAT || — || align=right | 2.1 km || 
|-id=418 bgcolor=#E9E9E9
| 217418 ||  || — || August 26, 2005 || Anderson Mesa || LONEOS || EUN || align=right | 1.5 km || 
|-id=419 bgcolor=#E9E9E9
| 217419 ||  || — || August 29, 2005 || Anderson Mesa || LONEOS || JUN || align=right | 1.4 km || 
|-id=420 bgcolor=#E9E9E9
| 217420 Olevsk ||  ||  || August 31, 2005 || Andrushivka || Andrushivka Obs. || — || align=right | 1.4 km || 
|-id=421 bgcolor=#E9E9E9
| 217421 ||  || — || August 30, 2005 || Kitt Peak || Spacewatch || — || align=right | 3.1 km || 
|-id=422 bgcolor=#E9E9E9
| 217422 ||  || — || August 29, 2005 || Palomar || NEAT || — || align=right | 3.5 km || 
|-id=423 bgcolor=#E9E9E9
| 217423 ||  || — || August 29, 2005 || Palomar || NEAT || — || align=right | 2.5 km || 
|-id=424 bgcolor=#E9E9E9
| 217424 ||  || — || August 27, 2005 || Palomar || NEAT || — || align=right | 2.2 km || 
|-id=425 bgcolor=#E9E9E9
| 217425 ||  || — || September 1, 2005 || Wrightwood || J. W. Young || — || align=right | 2.4 km || 
|-id=426 bgcolor=#E9E9E9
| 217426 ||  || — || September 10, 2005 || Anderson Mesa || LONEOS || — || align=right | 3.0 km || 
|-id=427 bgcolor=#E9E9E9
| 217427 ||  || — || September 9, 2005 || Socorro || LINEAR || — || align=right | 3.0 km || 
|-id=428 bgcolor=#E9E9E9
| 217428 ||  || — || September 11, 2005 || Anderson Mesa || LONEOS || JUN || align=right | 1.6 km || 
|-id=429 bgcolor=#E9E9E9
| 217429 ||  || — || September 10, 2005 || Anderson Mesa || LONEOS || WIT || align=right | 1.6 km || 
|-id=430 bgcolor=#FFC2E0
| 217430 ||  || — || September 28, 2005 || Palomar || NEAT || APOPHA || align=right data-sort-value="0.41" | 410 m || 
|-id=431 bgcolor=#E9E9E9
| 217431 ||  || — || September 23, 2005 || Kitt Peak || Spacewatch || — || align=right | 1.6 km || 
|-id=432 bgcolor=#E9E9E9
| 217432 ||  || — || September 26, 2005 || Calvin-Rehoboth || Calvin–Rehoboth Obs. || — || align=right | 1.8 km || 
|-id=433 bgcolor=#E9E9E9
| 217433 ||  || — || September 26, 2005 || Catalina || CSS || — || align=right | 4.9 km || 
|-id=434 bgcolor=#E9E9E9
| 217434 ||  || — || September 25, 2005 || Kitt Peak || Spacewatch || MRX || align=right | 2.0 km || 
|-id=435 bgcolor=#E9E9E9
| 217435 ||  || — || September 25, 2005 || Kitt Peak || Spacewatch || — || align=right | 2.0 km || 
|-id=436 bgcolor=#E9E9E9
| 217436 ||  || — || September 25, 2005 || Kitt Peak || Spacewatch || NEM || align=right | 3.5 km || 
|-id=437 bgcolor=#E9E9E9
| 217437 ||  || — || September 25, 2005 || Kitt Peak || Spacewatch || — || align=right | 2.9 km || 
|-id=438 bgcolor=#E9E9E9
| 217438 ||  || — || September 26, 2005 || Palomar || NEAT || — || align=right | 1.7 km || 
|-id=439 bgcolor=#E9E9E9
| 217439 ||  || — || September 26, 2005 || Palomar || NEAT || — || align=right | 2.2 km || 
|-id=440 bgcolor=#E9E9E9
| 217440 ||  || — || September 29, 2005 || Mount Lemmon || Mount Lemmon Survey || AST || align=right | 2.3 km || 
|-id=441 bgcolor=#E9E9E9
| 217441 ||  || — || September 30, 2005 || Kitt Peak || Spacewatch || NEM || align=right | 3.1 km || 
|-id=442 bgcolor=#E9E9E9
| 217442 ||  || — || September 30, 2005 || Anderson Mesa || LONEOS || NEM || align=right | 3.2 km || 
|-id=443 bgcolor=#E9E9E9
| 217443 ||  || — || September 30, 2005 || Anderson Mesa || LONEOS || — || align=right | 1.8 km || 
|-id=444 bgcolor=#E9E9E9
| 217444 ||  || — || September 30, 2005 || Kitt Peak || Spacewatch || NEM || align=right | 3.5 km || 
|-id=445 bgcolor=#E9E9E9
| 217445 ||  || — || September 30, 2005 || Palomar || NEAT || — || align=right | 3.5 km || 
|-id=446 bgcolor=#E9E9E9
| 217446 ||  || — || September 27, 2005 || Socorro || LINEAR || — || align=right | 2.0 km || 
|-id=447 bgcolor=#E9E9E9
| 217447 ||  || — || September 27, 2005 || Socorro || LINEAR || — || align=right | 1.7 km || 
|-id=448 bgcolor=#E9E9E9
| 217448 ||  || — || October 1, 2005 || Catalina || CSS || — || align=right | 2.1 km || 
|-id=449 bgcolor=#E9E9E9
| 217449 ||  || — || October 1, 2005 || Catalina || CSS || — || align=right | 2.5 km || 
|-id=450 bgcolor=#E9E9E9
| 217450 ||  || — || October 1, 2005 || Socorro || LINEAR || HOF || align=right | 3.9 km || 
|-id=451 bgcolor=#E9E9E9
| 217451 ||  || — || October 8, 2005 || Socorro || LINEAR || AER || align=right | 2.3 km || 
|-id=452 bgcolor=#E9E9E9
| 217452 ||  || — || October 9, 2005 || Kitt Peak || Spacewatch || WIT || align=right | 1.4 km || 
|-id=453 bgcolor=#E9E9E9
| 217453 ||  || — || October 11, 2005 || Anderson Mesa || LONEOS || — || align=right | 2.9 km || 
|-id=454 bgcolor=#E9E9E9
| 217454 ||  || — || October 1, 2005 || Anderson Mesa || LONEOS || ADE || align=right | 2.9 km || 
|-id=455 bgcolor=#E9E9E9
| 217455 ||  || — || October 1, 2005 || Catalina || CSS || — || align=right | 1.5 km || 
|-id=456 bgcolor=#E9E9E9
| 217456 ||  || — || October 25, 2005 || Catalina || CSS || — || align=right | 3.0 km || 
|-id=457 bgcolor=#E9E9E9
| 217457 ||  || — || October 22, 2005 || Catalina || CSS || — || align=right | 3.3 km || 
|-id=458 bgcolor=#d6d6d6
| 217458 ||  || — || October 22, 2005 || Palomar || NEAT || EOS || align=right | 3.3 km || 
|-id=459 bgcolor=#d6d6d6
| 217459 ||  || — || October 26, 2005 || Kitt Peak || Spacewatch || — || align=right | 3.4 km || 
|-id=460 bgcolor=#E9E9E9
| 217460 ||  || — || October 25, 2005 || Kitt Peak || Spacewatch || — || align=right | 3.1 km || 
|-id=461 bgcolor=#E9E9E9
| 217461 ||  || — || October 28, 2005 || Mount Lemmon || Mount Lemmon Survey || — || align=right | 3.7 km || 
|-id=462 bgcolor=#E9E9E9
| 217462 ||  || — || October 28, 2005 || Kitt Peak || Spacewatch || — || align=right | 3.3 km || 
|-id=463 bgcolor=#E9E9E9
| 217463 ||  || — || October 28, 2005 || Catalina || CSS || — || align=right | 3.2 km || 
|-id=464 bgcolor=#E9E9E9
| 217464 ||  || — || October 30, 2005 || Catalina || CSS || — || align=right | 2.9 km || 
|-id=465 bgcolor=#d6d6d6
| 217465 ||  || — || October 25, 2005 || Mount Lemmon || Mount Lemmon Survey || KOR || align=right | 1.9 km || 
|-id=466 bgcolor=#E9E9E9
| 217466 ||  || — || November 4, 2005 || Kambah || D. Herald || MAR || align=right | 1.4 km || 
|-id=467 bgcolor=#E9E9E9
| 217467 ||  || — || November 2, 2005 || Socorro || LINEAR || HOF || align=right | 3.5 km || 
|-id=468 bgcolor=#E9E9E9
| 217468 ||  || — || November 1, 2005 || Apache Point || A. C. Becker || — || align=right | 1.0 km || 
|-id=469 bgcolor=#d6d6d6
| 217469 ||  || — || November 21, 2005 || Kitt Peak || Spacewatch || — || align=right | 4.3 km || 
|-id=470 bgcolor=#d6d6d6
| 217470 ||  || — || November 21, 2005 || Kitt Peak || Spacewatch || — || align=right | 3.5 km || 
|-id=471 bgcolor=#d6d6d6
| 217471 ||  || — || November 26, 2005 || Mount Lemmon || Mount Lemmon Survey || KOR || align=right | 2.0 km || 
|-id=472 bgcolor=#d6d6d6
| 217472 ||  || — || November 29, 2005 || Catalina || CSS || — || align=right | 3.5 km || 
|-id=473 bgcolor=#d6d6d6
| 217473 ||  || — || November 30, 2005 || Socorro || LINEAR || EOS || align=right | 3.1 km || 
|-id=474 bgcolor=#E9E9E9
| 217474 ||  || — || November 27, 2005 || Socorro || LINEAR || — || align=right | 3.6 km || 
|-id=475 bgcolor=#fefefe
| 217475 ||  || — || November 25, 2005 || Mount Lemmon || Mount Lemmon Survey || V || align=right data-sort-value="0.83" | 830 m || 
|-id=476 bgcolor=#E9E9E9
| 217476 ||  || — || November 25, 2005 || Catalina || CSS || — || align=right | 2.5 km || 
|-id=477 bgcolor=#d6d6d6
| 217477 ||  || — || December 1, 2005 || Kitt Peak || Spacewatch || HYG || align=right | 7.1 km || 
|-id=478 bgcolor=#fefefe
| 217478 ||  || — || December 4, 2005 || Kitt Peak || Spacewatch || — || align=right | 2.1 km || 
|-id=479 bgcolor=#fefefe
| 217479 ||  || — || December 1, 2005 || Mount Lemmon || Mount Lemmon Survey || NYS || align=right | 1.0 km || 
|-id=480 bgcolor=#E9E9E9
| 217480 ||  || — || December 22, 2005 || Kitt Peak || Spacewatch || — || align=right | 4.1 km || 
|-id=481 bgcolor=#d6d6d6
| 217481 ||  || — || December 30, 2005 || Socorro || LINEAR || — || align=right | 5.9 km || 
|-id=482 bgcolor=#d6d6d6
| 217482 ||  || — || December 28, 2005 || Kitt Peak || Spacewatch || HYG || align=right | 4.5 km || 
|-id=483 bgcolor=#fefefe
| 217483 ||  || — || December 25, 2005 || Kitt Peak || Spacewatch || NYS || align=right data-sort-value="0.83" | 830 m || 
|-id=484 bgcolor=#fefefe
| 217484 ||  || — || January 31, 2006 || Kitt Peak || Spacewatch || NYS || align=right data-sort-value="0.95" | 950 m || 
|-id=485 bgcolor=#E9E9E9
| 217485 ||  || — || January 31, 2006 || Anderson Mesa || LONEOS || GAL || align=right | 2.2 km || 
|-id=486 bgcolor=#fefefe
| 217486 ||  || — || February 27, 2006 || Socorro || LINEAR || H || align=right | 1.1 km || 
|-id=487 bgcolor=#E9E9E9
| 217487 ||  || — || February 24, 2006 || Catalina || CSS || — || align=right | 3.1 km || 
|-id=488 bgcolor=#d6d6d6
| 217488 ||  || — || March 3, 2006 || Catalina || CSS || EOS || align=right | 3.3 km || 
|-id=489 bgcolor=#E9E9E9
| 217489 ||  || — || March 22, 2006 || Catalina || CSS || BRU || align=right | 5.2 km || 
|-id=490 bgcolor=#fefefe
| 217490 ||  || — || April 2, 2006 || Kitt Peak || Spacewatch || — || align=right | 1.2 km || 
|-id=491 bgcolor=#d6d6d6
| 217491 ||  || — || April 20, 2006 || Kitt Peak || Spacewatch || KOR || align=right | 1.7 km || 
|-id=492 bgcolor=#d6d6d6
| 217492 ||  || — || April 28, 2006 || Cerro Tololo || M. W. Buie || THM || align=right | 3.1 km || 
|-id=493 bgcolor=#E9E9E9
| 217493 ||  || — || May 22, 2006 || Kitt Peak || Spacewatch || MAR || align=right | 1.4 km || 
|-id=494 bgcolor=#fefefe
| 217494 ||  || — || September 14, 2006 || Hibiscus || S. F. Hönig || V || align=right data-sort-value="0.84" | 840 m || 
|-id=495 bgcolor=#E9E9E9
| 217495 ||  || — || September 16, 2006 || Catalina || CSS || — || align=right | 3.1 km || 
|-id=496 bgcolor=#fefefe
| 217496 ||  || — || September 16, 2006 || Anderson Mesa || LONEOS || — || align=right data-sort-value="0.97" | 970 m || 
|-id=497 bgcolor=#E9E9E9
| 217497 ||  || — || September 18, 2006 || Catalina || CSS || GEF || align=right | 2.1 km || 
|-id=498 bgcolor=#fefefe
| 217498 ||  || — || September 18, 2006 || Catalina || CSS || FLO || align=right data-sort-value="0.81" | 810 m || 
|-id=499 bgcolor=#fefefe
| 217499 ||  || — || September 20, 2006 || Palomar || NEAT || — || align=right | 1.3 km || 
|-id=500 bgcolor=#fefefe
| 217500 ||  || — || September 27, 2006 || Kitt Peak || Spacewatch || — || align=right data-sort-value="0.93" | 930 m || 
|}

217501–217600 

|-bgcolor=#fefefe
| 217501 ||  || — || September 30, 2006 || Catalina || CSS || — || align=right data-sort-value="0.73" | 730 m || 
|-id=502 bgcolor=#fefefe
| 217502 ||  || — || September 19, 2006 || Kitt Peak || Spacewatch || — || align=right data-sort-value="0.91" | 910 m || 
|-id=503 bgcolor=#E9E9E9
| 217503 ||  || — || September 19, 2006 || Kitt Peak || Spacewatch || — || align=right | 1.5 km || 
|-id=504 bgcolor=#fefefe
| 217504 ||  || — || October 2, 2006 || Mount Lemmon || Mount Lemmon Survey || V || align=right data-sort-value="0.89" | 890 m || 
|-id=505 bgcolor=#E9E9E9
| 217505 ||  || — || October 3, 2006 || Socorro || LINEAR || — || align=right | 4.1 km || 
|-id=506 bgcolor=#fefefe
| 217506 ||  || — || October 12, 2006 || Palomar || NEAT || FLO || align=right data-sort-value="0.87" | 870 m || 
|-id=507 bgcolor=#d6d6d6
| 217507 ||  || — || October 10, 2006 || Palomar || NEAT || — || align=right | 4.5 km || 
|-id=508 bgcolor=#fefefe
| 217508 ||  || — || October 15, 2006 || Kitt Peak || Spacewatch || NYS || align=right data-sort-value="0.98" | 980 m || 
|-id=509 bgcolor=#d6d6d6
| 217509 ||  || — || October 3, 2006 || Mount Lemmon || Mount Lemmon Survey || — || align=right | 3.5 km || 
|-id=510 bgcolor=#fefefe
| 217510 Dewaldroode ||  ||  || October 1, 2006 || Apache Point || A. C. Becker || — || align=right | 2.0 km || 
|-id=511 bgcolor=#fefefe
| 217511 ||  || — || October 16, 2006 || Goodricke-Pigott || R. A. Tucker || — || align=right | 1.1 km || 
|-id=512 bgcolor=#fefefe
| 217512 ||  || — || October 16, 2006 || Kitt Peak || Spacewatch || — || align=right data-sort-value="0.85" | 850 m || 
|-id=513 bgcolor=#fefefe
| 217513 ||  || — || October 17, 2006 || Kitt Peak || Spacewatch || — || align=right data-sort-value="0.82" | 820 m || 
|-id=514 bgcolor=#fefefe
| 217514 ||  || — || October 18, 2006 || Kitt Peak || Spacewatch || NYS || align=right data-sort-value="0.74" | 740 m || 
|-id=515 bgcolor=#fefefe
| 217515 ||  || — || October 18, 2006 || Kitt Peak || Spacewatch || — || align=right data-sort-value="0.97" | 970 m || 
|-id=516 bgcolor=#fefefe
| 217516 ||  || — || October 19, 2006 || Kitt Peak || Spacewatch || — || align=right | 1.1 km || 
|-id=517 bgcolor=#FA8072
| 217517 ||  || — || October 19, 2006 || Kitt Peak || Spacewatch || — || align=right | 1.0 km || 
|-id=518 bgcolor=#d6d6d6
| 217518 ||  || — || October 19, 2006 || Catalina || CSS || — || align=right | 6.1 km || 
|-id=519 bgcolor=#fefefe
| 217519 ||  || — || October 19, 2006 || Catalina || CSS || V || align=right data-sort-value="0.98" | 980 m || 
|-id=520 bgcolor=#fefefe
| 217520 ||  || — || October 19, 2006 || Catalina || CSS || — || align=right | 1.2 km || 
|-id=521 bgcolor=#fefefe
| 217521 ||  || — || October 19, 2006 || Catalina || CSS || V || align=right | 1.1 km || 
|-id=522 bgcolor=#fefefe
| 217522 ||  || — || October 18, 2006 || Kitt Peak || Spacewatch || — || align=right | 1.1 km || 
|-id=523 bgcolor=#fefefe
| 217523 ||  || — || November 10, 2006 || Kitt Peak || Spacewatch || — || align=right | 1.6 km || 
|-id=524 bgcolor=#fefefe
| 217524 ||  || — || November 11, 2006 || Kitt Peak || Spacewatch || NYS || align=right | 1.0 km || 
|-id=525 bgcolor=#fefefe
| 217525 ||  || — || November 9, 2006 || Palomar || NEAT || FLO || align=right | 1.0 km || 
|-id=526 bgcolor=#fefefe
| 217526 ||  || — || November 1, 2006 || Mount Lemmon || Mount Lemmon Survey || NYS || align=right data-sort-value="0.98" | 980 m || 
|-id=527 bgcolor=#E9E9E9
| 217527 ||  || — || November 17, 2006 || Mount Lemmon || Mount Lemmon Survey || — || align=right | 2.1 km || 
|-id=528 bgcolor=#fefefe
| 217528 ||  || — || November 17, 2006 || Mount Lemmon || Mount Lemmon Survey || NYS || align=right data-sort-value="0.87" | 870 m || 
|-id=529 bgcolor=#fefefe
| 217529 ||  || — || November 22, 2006 || Catalina || CSS || V || align=right data-sort-value="0.93" | 930 m || 
|-id=530 bgcolor=#fefefe
| 217530 ||  || — || November 24, 2006 || Kitt Peak || Spacewatch || NYS || align=right | 1.0 km || 
|-id=531 bgcolor=#E9E9E9
| 217531 ||  || — || November 25, 2006 || Kitt Peak || Spacewatch || — || align=right | 1.7 km || 
|-id=532 bgcolor=#E9E9E9
| 217532 ||  || — || November 23, 2006 || Mount Lemmon || Mount Lemmon Survey || — || align=right | 2.0 km || 
|-id=533 bgcolor=#fefefe
| 217533 ||  || — || December 15, 2006 || Socorro || LINEAR || — || align=right | 1.8 km || 
|-id=534 bgcolor=#fefefe
| 217534 ||  || — || December 21, 2006 || Kitt Peak || Spacewatch || — || align=right | 1.4 km || 
|-id=535 bgcolor=#fefefe
| 217535 ||  || — || December 22, 2006 || Socorro || LINEAR || — || align=right | 1.5 km || 
|-id=536 bgcolor=#d6d6d6
| 217536 ||  || — || December 24, 2006 || Mount Lemmon || Mount Lemmon Survey || URS || align=right | 5.5 km || 
|-id=537 bgcolor=#E9E9E9
| 217537 ||  || — || December 25, 2006 || Catalina || CSS || — || align=right | 4.1 km || 
|-id=538 bgcolor=#fefefe
| 217538 ||  || — || December 24, 2006 || Kitt Peak || Spacewatch || V || align=right | 1.1 km || 
|-id=539 bgcolor=#E9E9E9
| 217539 ||  || — || January 9, 2007 || Mount Lemmon || Mount Lemmon Survey || — || align=right | 4.2 km || 
|-id=540 bgcolor=#E9E9E9
| 217540 ||  || — || January 16, 2007 || Socorro || LINEAR || — || align=right | 2.7 km || 
|-id=541 bgcolor=#fefefe
| 217541 ||  || — || January 18, 2007 || Palomar || NEAT || — || align=right | 5.2 km || 
|-id=542 bgcolor=#E9E9E9
| 217542 ||  || — || January 21, 2007 || Socorro || LINEAR || GAL || align=right | 2.4 km || 
|-id=543 bgcolor=#E9E9E9
| 217543 ||  || — || February 6, 2007 || Mount Lemmon || Mount Lemmon Survey || GEF || align=right | 2.1 km || 
|-id=544 bgcolor=#E9E9E9
| 217544 ||  || — || February 6, 2007 || Mount Lemmon || Mount Lemmon Survey || — || align=right | 4.0 km || 
|-id=545 bgcolor=#d6d6d6
| 217545 ||  || — || February 17, 2007 || Mount Lemmon || Mount Lemmon Survey || — || align=right | 4.8 km || 
|-id=546 bgcolor=#d6d6d6
| 217546 ||  || — || February 21, 2007 || Kitt Peak || Spacewatch || — || align=right | 4.3 km || 
|-id=547 bgcolor=#d6d6d6
| 217547 ||  || — || February 21, 2007 || Mount Lemmon || Mount Lemmon Survey || — || align=right | 5.2 km || 
|-id=548 bgcolor=#C2FFFF
| 217548 ||  || — || March 15, 2007 || Catalina || CSS || L5 || align=right | 17 km || 
|-id=549 bgcolor=#E9E9E9
| 217549 ||  || — || March 20, 2007 || Kitt Peak || Spacewatch || — || align=right | 2.0 km || 
|-id=550 bgcolor=#E9E9E9
| 217550 ||  || — || April 11, 2007 || Kitt Peak || Spacewatch || — || align=right | 4.0 km || 
|-id=551 bgcolor=#fefefe
| 217551 ||  || — || April 11, 2007 || Kitt Peak || Spacewatch || NYS || align=right data-sort-value="0.71" | 710 m || 
|-id=552 bgcolor=#fefefe
| 217552 ||  || — || April 12, 2007 || Siding Spring || SSS || — || align=right | 2.4 km || 
|-id=553 bgcolor=#E9E9E9
| 217553 ||  || — || April 14, 2007 || Kitt Peak || Spacewatch || — || align=right | 3.4 km || 
|-id=554 bgcolor=#d6d6d6
| 217554 ||  || — || April 18, 2007 || Kitt Peak || Spacewatch || — || align=right | 5.8 km || 
|-id=555 bgcolor=#E9E9E9
| 217555 ||  || — || April 18, 2007 || Kitt Peak || Spacewatch || — || align=right | 3.5 km || 
|-id=556 bgcolor=#fefefe
| 217556 ||  || — || April 22, 2007 || Mount Lemmon || Mount Lemmon Survey || FLO || align=right data-sort-value="0.74" | 740 m || 
|-id=557 bgcolor=#E9E9E9
| 217557 ||  || — || May 7, 2007 || Kitt Peak || Spacewatch || RAF || align=right | 1.3 km || 
|-id=558 bgcolor=#E9E9E9
| 217558 ||  || — || May 11, 2007 || Kitt Peak || Spacewatch || BRU || align=right | 5.8 km || 
|-id=559 bgcolor=#fefefe
| 217559 ||  || — || June 20, 2007 || Kitt Peak || Spacewatch || — || align=right | 1.0 km || 
|-id=560 bgcolor=#E9E9E9
| 217560 ||  || — || July 16, 2007 || La Sagra || OAM Obs. || — || align=right | 1.6 km || 
|-id=561 bgcolor=#fefefe
| 217561 ||  || — || July 20, 2007 || Tiki || S. F. Hönig, N. Teamo || FLO || align=right data-sort-value="0.99" | 990 m || 
|-id=562 bgcolor=#fefefe
| 217562 ||  || — || August 6, 2007 || Lulin Observatory || LUSS || — || align=right | 1.4 km || 
|-id=563 bgcolor=#fefefe
| 217563 ||  || — || August 9, 2007 || Socorro || LINEAR || — || align=right | 1.4 km || 
|-id=564 bgcolor=#E9E9E9
| 217564 ||  || — || August 9, 2007 || Palomar || Palomar Obs. || — || align=right | 2.1 km || 
|-id=565 bgcolor=#fefefe
| 217565 ||  || — || September 5, 2007 || Catalina || CSS || SUL || align=right | 3.1 km || 
|-id=566 bgcolor=#d6d6d6
| 217566 ||  || — || September 8, 2007 || Anderson Mesa || LONEOS || THM || align=right | 3.8 km || 
|-id=567 bgcolor=#E9E9E9
| 217567 ||  || — || October 7, 2007 || Catalina || CSS || — || align=right | 1.3 km || 
|-id=568 bgcolor=#E9E9E9
| 217568 ||  || — || October 8, 2007 || Catalina || CSS || — || align=right | 2.1 km || 
|-id=569 bgcolor=#fefefe
| 217569 ||  || — || October 11, 2007 || Kitt Peak || Spacewatch || — || align=right | 1.1 km || 
|-id=570 bgcolor=#E9E9E9
| 217570 ||  || — || October 14, 2007 || Catalina || CSS || — || align=right | 4.8 km || 
|-id=571 bgcolor=#d6d6d6
| 217571 ||  || — || October 30, 2007 || Mount Lemmon || Mount Lemmon Survey || THM || align=right | 2.5 km || 
|-id=572 bgcolor=#E9E9E9
| 217572 ||  || — || November 8, 2007 || Mount Lemmon || Mount Lemmon Survey || BAR || align=right | 2.0 km || 
|-id=573 bgcolor=#E9E9E9
| 217573 ||  || — || November 4, 2007 || Mount Lemmon || Mount Lemmon Survey || HEN || align=right | 1.4 km || 
|-id=574 bgcolor=#d6d6d6
| 217574 ||  || — || November 14, 2007 || Kitt Peak || Spacewatch || THM || align=right | 4.4 km || 
|-id=575 bgcolor=#E9E9E9
| 217575 ||  || — || November 15, 2007 || Catalina || CSS || — || align=right | 1.6 km || 
|-id=576 bgcolor=#d6d6d6
| 217576 Klausbirkner ||  ||  || December 29, 2007 || Turtle Star Observatory || A. Martin, A. Boeker || — || align=right | 3.4 km || 
|-id=577 bgcolor=#fefefe
| 217577 ||  || — || January 10, 2008 || Kitt Peak || Spacewatch || MAS || align=right data-sort-value="0.93" | 930 m || 
|-id=578 bgcolor=#fefefe
| 217578 ||  || — || January 11, 2008 || Mount Lemmon || Mount Lemmon Survey || — || align=right | 1.1 km || 
|-id=579 bgcolor=#fefefe
| 217579 ||  || — || January 30, 2008 || Mount Lemmon || Mount Lemmon Survey || NYS || align=right | 1.00 km || 
|-id=580 bgcolor=#fefefe
| 217580 ||  || — || February 2, 2008 || Kitt Peak || Spacewatch || MAS || align=right | 1.0 km || 
|-id=581 bgcolor=#fefefe
| 217581 ||  || — || February 1, 2008 || Kitt Peak || Spacewatch || — || align=right | 1.4 km || 
|-id=582 bgcolor=#d6d6d6
| 217582 ||  || — || February 1, 2008 || Kitt Peak || Spacewatch || — || align=right | 4.2 km || 
|-id=583 bgcolor=#fefefe
| 217583 ||  || — || February 7, 2008 || Mount Lemmon || Mount Lemmon Survey || — || align=right | 1.1 km || 
|-id=584 bgcolor=#E9E9E9
| 217584 ||  || — || February 7, 2008 || Mount Lemmon || Mount Lemmon Survey || — || align=right | 2.5 km || 
|-id=585 bgcolor=#E9E9E9
| 217585 ||  || — || February 12, 2008 || Kitt Peak || Spacewatch || TIN || align=right | 2.6 km || 
|-id=586 bgcolor=#fefefe
| 217586 ||  || — || February 8, 2008 || Kitt Peak || Spacewatch || MAS || align=right | 1.0 km || 
|-id=587 bgcolor=#fefefe
| 217587 ||  || — || February 26, 2008 || Kitt Peak || Spacewatch || FLO || align=right data-sort-value="0.97" | 970 m || 
|-id=588 bgcolor=#d6d6d6
| 217588 ||  || — || February 26, 2008 || Kitt Peak || Spacewatch || EUP || align=right | 4.4 km || 
|-id=589 bgcolor=#E9E9E9
| 217589 ||  || — || March 4, 2008 || Mount Lemmon || Mount Lemmon Survey || — || align=right | 3.4 km || 
|-id=590 bgcolor=#E9E9E9
| 217590 ||  || — || March 5, 2008 || Kitt Peak || Spacewatch || — || align=right | 2.5 km || 
|-id=591 bgcolor=#E9E9E9
| 217591 ||  || — || March 6, 2008 || Kitt Peak || Spacewatch || — || align=right | 2.7 km || 
|-id=592 bgcolor=#E9E9E9
| 217592 ||  || — || March 8, 2008 || Socorro || LINEAR || — || align=right | 3.1 km || 
|-id=593 bgcolor=#fefefe
| 217593 ||  || — || March 25, 2008 || Kitt Peak || Spacewatch || CLA || align=right | 2.2 km || 
|-id=594 bgcolor=#E9E9E9
| 217594 ||  || — || March 28, 2008 || Kitt Peak || Spacewatch || — || align=right | 2.3 km || 
|-id=595 bgcolor=#E9E9E9
| 217595 ||  || — || March 30, 2008 || Catalina || CSS || — || align=right | 2.4 km || 
|-id=596 bgcolor=#E9E9E9
| 217596 ||  || — || April 4, 2008 || Kitt Peak || Spacewatch || AGN || align=right | 1.7 km || 
|-id=597 bgcolor=#d6d6d6
| 217597 ||  || — || April 14, 2008 || Mount Lemmon || Mount Lemmon Survey || — || align=right | 5.3 km || 
|-id=598 bgcolor=#E9E9E9
| 217598 ||  || — || April 4, 2008 || Catalina || CSS || — || align=right | 3.9 km || 
|-id=599 bgcolor=#d6d6d6
| 217599 ||  || — || April 24, 2008 || Kitt Peak || Spacewatch || — || align=right | 4.1 km || 
|-id=600 bgcolor=#E9E9E9
| 217600 ||  || — || May 1, 2008 || Catalina || CSS || — || align=right | 2.8 km || 
|}

217601–217700 

|-bgcolor=#E9E9E9
| 217601 ||  || — || May 6, 2008 || Wildberg || R. Apitzsch || NEM || align=right | 3.5 km || 
|-id=602 bgcolor=#fefefe
| 217602 ||  || — || May 1, 2008 || Kitt Peak || Spacewatch || — || align=right | 1.5 km || 
|-id=603 bgcolor=#d6d6d6
| 217603 Grove Creek ||  ||  || May 9, 2008 || Grove Creek || F. Tozzi || URS || align=right | 5.5 km || 
|-id=604 bgcolor=#d6d6d6
| 217604 ||  || — || May 28, 2008 || Kitt Peak || Spacewatch || 3:2 || align=right | 7.2 km || 
|-id=605 bgcolor=#d6d6d6
| 217605 ||  || — || May 30, 2008 || Kitt Peak || Spacewatch || CHA || align=right | 2.4 km || 
|-id=606 bgcolor=#fefefe
| 217606 ||  || — || September 5, 2008 || Kitt Peak || Spacewatch || V || align=right | 1.0 km || 
|-id=607 bgcolor=#d6d6d6
| 217607 ||  || — || September 7, 2008 || Catalina || CSS || EOS || align=right | 3.2 km || 
|-id=608 bgcolor=#E9E9E9
| 217608 ||  || — || September 24, 2008 || Mount Lemmon || Mount Lemmon Survey || — || align=right | 4.2 km || 
|-id=609 bgcolor=#E9E9E9
| 217609 ||  || — || September 23, 2008 || Catalina || CSS || WIT || align=right | 1.6 km || 
|-id=610 bgcolor=#fefefe
| 217610 ||  || — || October 1, 2008 || Mount Lemmon || Mount Lemmon Survey || MAS || align=right data-sort-value="0.94" | 940 m || 
|-id=611 bgcolor=#d6d6d6
| 217611 ||  || — || October 1, 2008 || Mount Lemmon || Mount Lemmon Survey || CHA || align=right | 2.5 km || 
|-id=612 bgcolor=#C2FFFF
| 217612 ||  || — || October 8, 2008 || Mount Lemmon || Mount Lemmon Survey || L4 || align=right | 19 km || 
|-id=613 bgcolor=#E9E9E9
| 217613 ||  || — || October 20, 2008 || Kitt Peak || Spacewatch || HOF || align=right | 3.6 km || 
|-id=614 bgcolor=#d6d6d6
| 217614 ||  || — || October 24, 2008 || Kitt Peak || Spacewatch || — || align=right | 3.9 km || 
|-id=615 bgcolor=#d6d6d6
| 217615 ||  || — || October 27, 2008 || Socorro || LINEAR || — || align=right | 5.4 km || 
|-id=616 bgcolor=#d6d6d6
| 217616 ||  || — || October 28, 2008 || Kitt Peak || Spacewatch || — || align=right | 2.9 km || 
|-id=617 bgcolor=#d6d6d6
| 217617 ||  || — || October 28, 2008 || Kitt Peak || Spacewatch || — || align=right | 3.7 km || 
|-id=618 bgcolor=#d6d6d6
| 217618 ||  || — || November 1, 2008 || Kitt Peak || Spacewatch || CHA || align=right | 2.6 km || 
|-id=619 bgcolor=#E9E9E9
| 217619 ||  || — || November 2, 2008 || Mount Lemmon || Mount Lemmon Survey || NEM || align=right | 3.5 km || 
|-id=620 bgcolor=#fefefe
| 217620 ||  || — || January 21, 2009 || Sierra Stars || F. Tozzi || H || align=right data-sort-value="0.83" | 830 m || 
|-id=621 bgcolor=#fefefe
| 217621 ||  || — || January 31, 2009 || Kitt Peak || Spacewatch || NYS || align=right data-sort-value="0.84" | 840 m || 
|-id=622 bgcolor=#fefefe
| 217622 ||  || — || April 3, 2009 || Catalina || CSS || — || align=right | 2.1 km || 
|-id=623 bgcolor=#fefefe
| 217623 ||  || — || April 22, 2009 || Mount Lemmon || Mount Lemmon Survey || MAS || align=right data-sort-value="0.80" | 800 m || 
|-id=624 bgcolor=#E9E9E9
| 217624 || 5003 T-2 || — || September 25, 1973 || Palomar || PLS || — || align=right | 1.6 km || 
|-id=625 bgcolor=#E9E9E9
| 217625 || 5408 T-2 || — || September 30, 1973 || Palomar || PLS || — || align=right | 2.5 km || 
|-id=626 bgcolor=#d6d6d6
| 217626 || 1027 T-3 || — || October 17, 1977 || Palomar || PLS || — || align=right | 3.8 km || 
|-id=627 bgcolor=#fefefe
| 217627 || 1064 T-3 || — || October 17, 1977 || Palomar || PLS || — || align=right | 1.1 km || 
|-id=628 bgcolor=#FFC2E0
| 217628 Lugh ||  ||  || April 17, 1990 || Kleť || A. Mrkos || APO +1kmPHA || align=right | 1.4 km || 
|-id=629 bgcolor=#E9E9E9
| 217629 ||  || — || September 25, 1992 || Kitt Peak || Spacewatch || — || align=right | 2.8 km || 
|-id=630 bgcolor=#fefefe
| 217630 ||  || — || January 22, 1993 || Kitt Peak || Spacewatch || MAS || align=right | 1.1 km || 
|-id=631 bgcolor=#d6d6d6
| 217631 ||  || — || October 9, 1993 || La Silla || E. W. Elst || — || align=right | 4.2 km || 
|-id=632 bgcolor=#d6d6d6
| 217632 ||  || — || October 9, 1993 || La Silla || E. W. Elst || HYG || align=right | 3.7 km || 
|-id=633 bgcolor=#fefefe
| 217633 ||  || — || November 14, 1995 || Kitt Peak || Spacewatch || NYS || align=right data-sort-value="0.88" | 880 m || 
|-id=634 bgcolor=#fefefe
| 217634 ||  || — || November 14, 1995 || Kitt Peak || Spacewatch || MAS || align=right data-sort-value="0.90" | 900 m || 
|-id=635 bgcolor=#d6d6d6
| 217635 ||  || — || April 12, 1996 || Kitt Peak || Spacewatch || — || align=right | 3.7 km || 
|-id=636 bgcolor=#fefefe
| 217636 ||  || — || August 14, 1996 || Haleakala || AMOS || H || align=right | 1.2 km || 
|-id=637 bgcolor=#fefefe
| 217637 ||  || — || November 4, 1996 || Kitt Peak || Spacewatch || — || align=right | 1.0 km || 
|-id=638 bgcolor=#E9E9E9
| 217638 ||  || — || December 7, 1996 || Kitt Peak || Spacewatch || — || align=right | 3.1 km || 
|-id=639 bgcolor=#E9E9E9
| 217639 ||  || — || December 4, 1996 || Kitt Peak || Spacewatch || — || align=right | 1.5 km || 
|-id=640 bgcolor=#fefefe
| 217640 ||  || — || March 4, 1997 || Kitt Peak || Spacewatch || NYS || align=right data-sort-value="0.98" | 980 m || 
|-id=641 bgcolor=#d6d6d6
| 217641 ||  || — || July 9, 1997 || Kitt Peak || Spacewatch || HYG || align=right | 3.8 km || 
|-id=642 bgcolor=#E9E9E9
| 217642 ||  || — || October 31, 1997 || Xinglong || SCAP || RAF || align=right | 1.3 km || 
|-id=643 bgcolor=#E9E9E9
| 217643 ||  || — || November 22, 1997 || Kitt Peak || Spacewatch || — || align=right | 1.4 km || 
|-id=644 bgcolor=#E9E9E9
| 217644 ||  || — || February 28, 1998 || Kitt Peak || Spacewatch || — || align=right | 2.5 km || 
|-id=645 bgcolor=#fefefe
| 217645 ||  || — || March 22, 1998 || Socorro || LINEAR || H || align=right | 1.1 km || 
|-id=646 bgcolor=#d6d6d6
| 217646 ||  || — || May 27, 1998 || Kitt Peak || Spacewatch || — || align=right | 4.2 km || 
|-id=647 bgcolor=#fefefe
| 217647 ||  || — || July 26, 1998 || La Silla || E. W. Elst || PHO || align=right | 1.4 km || 
|-id=648 bgcolor=#d6d6d6
| 217648 ||  || — || August 17, 1998 || Socorro || LINEAR || — || align=right | 5.5 km || 
|-id=649 bgcolor=#d6d6d6
| 217649 ||  || — || August 17, 1998 || Socorro || LINEAR || LIX || align=right | 5.6 km || 
|-id=650 bgcolor=#d6d6d6
| 217650 ||  || — || August 23, 1998 || Xinglong || SCAP || TIR || align=right | 4.0 km || 
|-id=651 bgcolor=#d6d6d6
| 217651 ||  || — || August 17, 1998 || Socorro || LINEAR || TIR || align=right | 4.3 km || 
|-id=652 bgcolor=#fefefe
| 217652 ||  || — || August 17, 1998 || Socorro || LINEAR || — || align=right | 1.6 km || 
|-id=653 bgcolor=#d6d6d6
| 217653 ||  || — || August 24, 1998 || Socorro || LINEAR || THB || align=right | 3.8 km || 
|-id=654 bgcolor=#FA8072
| 217654 ||  || — || September 14, 1998 || Socorro || LINEAR || H || align=right | 1.1 km || 
|-id=655 bgcolor=#fefefe
| 217655 ||  || — || September 13, 1998 || Kitt Peak || Spacewatch || V || align=right | 1.0 km || 
|-id=656 bgcolor=#fefefe
| 217656 ||  || — || September 14, 1998 || Socorro || LINEAR || NYS || align=right | 1.2 km || 
|-id=657 bgcolor=#d6d6d6
| 217657 ||  || — || September 14, 1998 || Socorro || LINEAR || — || align=right | 6.3 km || 
|-id=658 bgcolor=#fefefe
| 217658 ||  || — || September 15, 1998 || Anderson Mesa || LONEOS || — || align=right | 1.1 km || 
|-id=659 bgcolor=#fefefe
| 217659 ||  || — || September 21, 1998 || Kitt Peak || Spacewatch || NYS || align=right data-sort-value="0.71" | 710 m || 
|-id=660 bgcolor=#d6d6d6
| 217660 ||  || — || September 21, 1998 || Kitt Peak || Spacewatch || — || align=right | 3.9 km || 
|-id=661 bgcolor=#d6d6d6
| 217661 ||  || — || September 16, 1998 || Anderson Mesa || LONEOS || LIX || align=right | 6.6 km || 
|-id=662 bgcolor=#fefefe
| 217662 ||  || — || September 19, 1998 || Socorro || LINEAR || — || align=right | 1.3 km || 
|-id=663 bgcolor=#d6d6d6
| 217663 ||  || — || September 26, 1998 || Socorro || LINEAR || HYG || align=right | 5.0 km || 
|-id=664 bgcolor=#d6d6d6
| 217664 ||  || — || September 26, 1998 || Socorro || LINEAR || URS || align=right | 4.5 km || 
|-id=665 bgcolor=#d6d6d6
| 217665 ||  || — || September 26, 1998 || Socorro || LINEAR || EUP || align=right | 4.7 km || 
|-id=666 bgcolor=#d6d6d6
| 217666 ||  || — || September 26, 1998 || Socorro || LINEAR || EUP || align=right | 7.9 km || 
|-id=667 bgcolor=#fefefe
| 217667 ||  || — || September 26, 1998 || Socorro || LINEAR || — || align=right | 1.4 km || 
|-id=668 bgcolor=#d6d6d6
| 217668 ||  || — || October 19, 1998 || Catalina || CSS || EUP || align=right | 7.5 km || 
|-id=669 bgcolor=#fefefe
| 217669 ||  || — || October 22, 1998 || Caussols || ODAS || NYS || align=right data-sort-value="0.88" | 880 m || 
|-id=670 bgcolor=#C2FFFF
| 217670 ||  || — || October 22, 1998 || NRC-DAO || D. D. Balam || L4 || align=right | 13 km || 
|-id=671 bgcolor=#fefefe
| 217671 ||  || — || October 17, 1998 || Anderson Mesa || LONEOS || — || align=right | 1.5 km || 
|-id=672 bgcolor=#d6d6d6
| 217672 ||  || — || October 29, 1998 || Socorro || LINEAR || EUP || align=right | 7.0 km || 
|-id=673 bgcolor=#fefefe
| 217673 ||  || — || October 18, 1998 || La Silla || E. W. Elst || — || align=right | 1.0 km || 
|-id=674 bgcolor=#fefefe
| 217674 ||  || — || November 14, 1998 || Kitt Peak || Spacewatch || V || align=right | 1.2 km || 
|-id=675 bgcolor=#d6d6d6
| 217675 ||  || — || November 19, 1998 || Caussols || ODAS || — || align=right | 3.9 km || 
|-id=676 bgcolor=#d6d6d6
| 217676 ||  || — || January 13, 1999 || Kitt Peak || Spacewatch || — || align=right | 5.0 km || 
|-id=677 bgcolor=#fefefe
| 217677 ||  || — || January 19, 1999 || Kitt Peak || Spacewatch || — || align=right | 1.3 km || 
|-id=678 bgcolor=#E9E9E9
| 217678 ||  || — || February 12, 1999 || Socorro || LINEAR || — || align=right | 3.2 km || 
|-id=679 bgcolor=#E9E9E9
| 217679 ||  || — || February 12, 1999 || Socorro || LINEAR || — || align=right | 2.8 km || 
|-id=680 bgcolor=#E9E9E9
| 217680 ||  || — || February 10, 1999 || Socorro || LINEAR || — || align=right | 2.5 km || 
|-id=681 bgcolor=#E9E9E9
| 217681 ||  || — || May 10, 1999 || Socorro || LINEAR || — || align=right | 3.5 km || 
|-id=682 bgcolor=#fefefe
| 217682 ||  || — || September 7, 1999 || Socorro || LINEAR || PHO || align=right | 2.0 km || 
|-id=683 bgcolor=#FFC2E0
| 217683 ||  || — || September 11, 1999 || Anderson Mesa || LONEOS || AMO || align=right data-sort-value="0.62" | 620 m || 
|-id=684 bgcolor=#fefefe
| 217684 ||  || — || September 7, 1999 || Socorro || LINEAR || — || align=right | 1.0 km || 
|-id=685 bgcolor=#fefefe
| 217685 ||  || — || September 7, 1999 || Socorro || LINEAR || — || align=right | 1.3 km || 
|-id=686 bgcolor=#FA8072
| 217686 ||  || — || September 7, 1999 || Socorro || LINEAR || — || align=right | 1.3 km || 
|-id=687 bgcolor=#fefefe
| 217687 ||  || — || September 7, 1999 || Socorro || LINEAR || — || align=right | 1.4 km || 
|-id=688 bgcolor=#fefefe
| 217688 ||  || — || September 9, 1999 || Socorro || LINEAR || FLO || align=right data-sort-value="0.85" | 850 m || 
|-id=689 bgcolor=#d6d6d6
| 217689 ||  || — || September 14, 1999 || Kitt Peak || Spacewatch || KOR || align=right | 2.1 km || 
|-id=690 bgcolor=#fefefe
| 217690 ||  || — || September 8, 1999 || Socorro || LINEAR || — || align=right | 2.5 km || 
|-id=691 bgcolor=#fefefe
| 217691 ||  || — || September 8, 1999 || Socorro || LINEAR || FLO || align=right | 1.0 km || 
|-id=692 bgcolor=#d6d6d6
| 217692 ||  || — || September 8, 1999 || Socorro || LINEAR || — || align=right | 5.1 km || 
|-id=693 bgcolor=#d6d6d6
| 217693 ||  || — || September 4, 1999 || Catalina || CSS || — || align=right | 3.5 km || 
|-id=694 bgcolor=#d6d6d6
| 217694 ||  || — || September 3, 1999 || Kitt Peak || Spacewatch || — || align=right | 3.6 km || 
|-id=695 bgcolor=#fefefe
| 217695 ||  || — || September 4, 1999 || Anderson Mesa || LONEOS || PHO || align=right | 2.3 km || 
|-id=696 bgcolor=#d6d6d6
| 217696 ||  || — || September 24, 1999 || Socorro || LINEAR || — || align=right | 4.5 km || 
|-id=697 bgcolor=#fefefe
| 217697 ||  || — || September 30, 1999 || Catalina || CSS || V || align=right | 1.3 km || 
|-id=698 bgcolor=#fefefe
| 217698 ||  || — || October 7, 1999 || Višnjan Observatory || K. Korlević, M. Jurić || — || align=right | 2.4 km || 
|-id=699 bgcolor=#d6d6d6
| 217699 ||  || — || October 4, 1999 || Kitt Peak || Spacewatch || — || align=right | 3.6 km || 
|-id=700 bgcolor=#d6d6d6
| 217700 ||  || — || October 7, 1999 || Kitt Peak || Spacewatch || KOR || align=right | 1.8 km || 
|}

217701–217800 

|-bgcolor=#fefefe
| 217701 ||  || — || October 12, 1999 || Kitt Peak || Spacewatch || NYS || align=right data-sort-value="0.79" | 790 m || 
|-id=702 bgcolor=#d6d6d6
| 217702 ||  || — || October 4, 1999 || Socorro || LINEAR || — || align=right | 4.0 km || 
|-id=703 bgcolor=#d6d6d6
| 217703 ||  || — || October 6, 1999 || Socorro || LINEAR || EOS || align=right | 3.3 km || 
|-id=704 bgcolor=#fefefe
| 217704 ||  || — || October 6, 1999 || Socorro || LINEAR || — || align=right data-sort-value="0.80" | 800 m || 
|-id=705 bgcolor=#d6d6d6
| 217705 ||  || — || October 12, 1999 || Socorro || LINEAR || — || align=right | 4.1 km || 
|-id=706 bgcolor=#d6d6d6
| 217706 ||  || — || October 12, 1999 || Socorro || LINEAR || — || align=right | 5.1 km || 
|-id=707 bgcolor=#d6d6d6
| 217707 ||  || — || October 12, 1999 || Socorro || LINEAR || EMA || align=right | 5.1 km || 
|-id=708 bgcolor=#fefefe
| 217708 ||  || — || October 12, 1999 || Socorro || LINEAR || — || align=right | 1.4 km || 
|-id=709 bgcolor=#d6d6d6
| 217709 ||  || — || October 15, 1999 || Socorro || LINEAR || — || align=right | 3.0 km || 
|-id=710 bgcolor=#fefefe
| 217710 ||  || — || October 3, 1999 || Socorro || LINEAR || H || align=right data-sort-value="0.88" | 880 m || 
|-id=711 bgcolor=#d6d6d6
| 217711 ||  || — || October 7, 1999 || Catalina || CSS || LAU || align=right | 1.7 km || 
|-id=712 bgcolor=#d6d6d6
| 217712 ||  || — || October 9, 1999 || Kitt Peak || Spacewatch || KOR || align=right | 2.3 km || 
|-id=713 bgcolor=#fefefe
| 217713 ||  || — || October 3, 1999 || Socorro || LINEAR || — || align=right data-sort-value="0.94" | 940 m || 
|-id=714 bgcolor=#fefefe
| 217714 ||  || — || October 31, 1999 || Catalina || CSS || FLO || align=right data-sort-value="0.86" | 860 m || 
|-id=715 bgcolor=#d6d6d6
| 217715 ||  || — || November 2, 1999 || Kitt Peak || Spacewatch || TRE || align=right | 3.7 km || 
|-id=716 bgcolor=#FA8072
| 217716 ||  || — || November 4, 1999 || Socorro || LINEAR || — || align=right | 1.0 km || 
|-id=717 bgcolor=#d6d6d6
| 217717 ||  || — || November 9, 1999 || Catalina || CSS || TEL || align=right | 2.7 km || 
|-id=718 bgcolor=#fefefe
| 217718 ||  || — || November 9, 1999 || Socorro || LINEAR || — || align=right | 1.2 km || 
|-id=719 bgcolor=#d6d6d6
| 217719 ||  || — || November 9, 1999 || Socorro || LINEAR || — || align=right | 4.5 km || 
|-id=720 bgcolor=#d6d6d6
| 217720 ||  || — || November 9, 1999 || Socorro || LINEAR || — || align=right | 5.7 km || 
|-id=721 bgcolor=#d6d6d6
| 217721 ||  || — || November 3, 1999 || Kitt Peak || Spacewatch || HYG || align=right | 3.6 km || 
|-id=722 bgcolor=#d6d6d6
| 217722 ||  || — || November 12, 1999 || Kitt Peak || Spacewatch || — || align=right | 3.0 km || 
|-id=723 bgcolor=#fefefe
| 217723 ||  || — || November 14, 1999 || Socorro || LINEAR || — || align=right data-sort-value="0.89" | 890 m || 
|-id=724 bgcolor=#d6d6d6
| 217724 ||  || — || November 14, 1999 || Socorro || LINEAR || — || align=right | 4.9 km || 
|-id=725 bgcolor=#fefefe
| 217725 ||  || — || November 6, 1999 || Socorro || LINEAR || FLO || align=right data-sort-value="0.85" | 850 m || 
|-id=726 bgcolor=#FA8072
| 217726 Kitabeppu ||  ||  || November 16, 1999 || Kuma Kogen || A. Nakamura || — || align=right | 1.3 km || 
|-id=727 bgcolor=#fefefe
| 217727 ||  || — || December 7, 1999 || Socorro || LINEAR || — || align=right | 1.1 km || 
|-id=728 bgcolor=#d6d6d6
| 217728 ||  || — || December 7, 1999 || Socorro || LINEAR || — || align=right | 5.1 km || 
|-id=729 bgcolor=#d6d6d6
| 217729 ||  || — || December 7, 1999 || Socorro || LINEAR || — || align=right | 5.1 km || 
|-id=730 bgcolor=#d6d6d6
| 217730 ||  || — || December 11, 1999 || Socorro || LINEAR || — || align=right | 5.1 km || 
|-id=731 bgcolor=#d6d6d6
| 217731 ||  || — || December 5, 1999 || Catalina || CSS || ALA || align=right | 6.0 km || 
|-id=732 bgcolor=#fefefe
| 217732 ||  || — || December 7, 1999 || Kitt Peak || Spacewatch || FLO || align=right data-sort-value="0.82" | 820 m || 
|-id=733 bgcolor=#d6d6d6
| 217733 ||  || — || December 10, 1999 || Socorro || LINEAR || — || align=right | 5.8 km || 
|-id=734 bgcolor=#fefefe
| 217734 ||  || — || December 12, 1999 || Socorro || LINEAR || V || align=right | 1.3 km || 
|-id=735 bgcolor=#d6d6d6
| 217735 ||  || — || January 3, 2000 || Socorro || LINEAR || — || align=right | 6.1 km || 
|-id=736 bgcolor=#d6d6d6
| 217736 ||  || — || January 8, 2000 || Socorro || LINEAR || — || align=right | 7.1 km || 
|-id=737 bgcolor=#d6d6d6
| 217737 ||  || — || January 8, 2000 || Kitt Peak || Spacewatch || — || align=right | 4.8 km || 
|-id=738 bgcolor=#d6d6d6
| 217738 ||  || — || January 27, 2000 || Kitt Peak || Spacewatch || — || align=right | 3.3 km || 
|-id=739 bgcolor=#fefefe
| 217739 ||  || — || January 29, 2000 || Kitt Peak || Spacewatch || — || align=right | 1.5 km || 
|-id=740 bgcolor=#d6d6d6
| 217740 ||  || — || January 28, 2000 || Kitt Peak || Spacewatch || fast? || align=right | 5.6 km || 
|-id=741 bgcolor=#d6d6d6
| 217741 ||  || — || February 2, 2000 || Socorro || LINEAR || — || align=right | 6.1 km || 
|-id=742 bgcolor=#fefefe
| 217742 ||  || — || February 2, 2000 || Socorro || LINEAR || — || align=right | 1.3 km || 
|-id=743 bgcolor=#fefefe
| 217743 ||  || — || February 2, 2000 || Socorro || LINEAR || V || align=right | 1.3 km || 
|-id=744 bgcolor=#fefefe
| 217744 ||  || — || February 3, 2000 || Socorro || LINEAR || — || align=right | 1.4 km || 
|-id=745 bgcolor=#fefefe
| 217745 ||  || — || February 4, 2000 || Socorro || LINEAR || — || align=right | 1.6 km || 
|-id=746 bgcolor=#d6d6d6
| 217746 ||  || — || February 2, 2000 || Socorro || LINEAR || — || align=right | 5.1 km || 
|-id=747 bgcolor=#fefefe
| 217747 ||  || — || February 29, 2000 || Socorro || LINEAR || FLO || align=right | 1.2 km || 
|-id=748 bgcolor=#fefefe
| 217748 ||  || — || February 29, 2000 || Socorro || LINEAR || H || align=right data-sort-value="0.88" | 880 m || 
|-id=749 bgcolor=#fefefe
| 217749 ||  || — || March 10, 2000 || Socorro || LINEAR || — || align=right | 1.4 km || 
|-id=750 bgcolor=#fefefe
| 217750 ||  || — || March 11, 2000 || Socorro || LINEAR || — || align=right | 1.6 km || 
|-id=751 bgcolor=#fefefe
| 217751 ||  || — || April 5, 2000 || Socorro || LINEAR || V || align=right data-sort-value="0.89" | 890 m || 
|-id=752 bgcolor=#E9E9E9
| 217752 ||  || — || April 12, 2000 || Haleakala || NEAT || — || align=right | 3.0 km || 
|-id=753 bgcolor=#E9E9E9
| 217753 ||  || — || April 29, 2000 || Socorro || LINEAR || — || align=right | 3.4 km || 
|-id=754 bgcolor=#E9E9E9
| 217754 ||  || — || April 26, 2000 || Anderson Mesa || LONEOS || EUN || align=right | 1.9 km || 
|-id=755 bgcolor=#E9E9E9
| 217755 ||  || — || July 30, 2000 || Socorro || LINEAR || — || align=right | 2.8 km || 
|-id=756 bgcolor=#FA8072
| 217756 ||  || — || August 25, 2000 || Črni Vrh || Črni Vrh || — || align=right data-sort-value="0.87" | 870 m || 
|-id=757 bgcolor=#E9E9E9
| 217757 ||  || — || August 24, 2000 || Socorro || LINEAR || — || align=right | 2.7 km || 
|-id=758 bgcolor=#E9E9E9
| 217758 ||  || — || August 24, 2000 || Socorro || LINEAR || — || align=right | 3.3 km || 
|-id=759 bgcolor=#E9E9E9
| 217759 ||  || — || August 24, 2000 || Socorro || LINEAR || — || align=right | 3.9 km || 
|-id=760 bgcolor=#E9E9E9
| 217760 ||  || — || August 29, 2000 || Socorro || LINEAR || — || align=right | 3.7 km || 
|-id=761 bgcolor=#E9E9E9
| 217761 ||  || — || August 29, 2000 || Socorro || LINEAR || — || align=right | 3.0 km || 
|-id=762 bgcolor=#E9E9E9
| 217762 ||  || — || August 25, 2000 || Socorro || LINEAR || EUN || align=right | 2.1 km || 
|-id=763 bgcolor=#E9E9E9
| 217763 ||  || — || August 25, 2000 || Socorro || LINEAR || — || align=right | 5.3 km || 
|-id=764 bgcolor=#E9E9E9
| 217764 ||  || — || August 31, 2000 || Socorro || LINEAR || — || align=right | 4.3 km || 
|-id=765 bgcolor=#E9E9E9
| 217765 ||  || — || August 31, 2000 || Socorro || LINEAR || — || align=right | 3.0 km || 
|-id=766 bgcolor=#E9E9E9
| 217766 ||  || — || August 31, 2000 || Socorro || LINEAR || CLO || align=right | 3.0 km || 
|-id=767 bgcolor=#E9E9E9
| 217767 ||  || — || August 31, 2000 || Socorro || LINEAR || — || align=right | 3.0 km || 
|-id=768 bgcolor=#E9E9E9
| 217768 ||  || — || August 21, 2000 || Anderson Mesa || LONEOS || — || align=right | 4.1 km || 
|-id=769 bgcolor=#E9E9E9
| 217769 ||  || — || August 20, 2000 || Anderson Mesa || LONEOS || GEF || align=right | 1.8 km || 
|-id=770 bgcolor=#E9E9E9
| 217770 ||  || — || September 2, 2000 || Eskridge || G. Hug || GEF || align=right | 2.1 km || 
|-id=771 bgcolor=#E9E9E9
| 217771 ||  || — || September 1, 2000 || Socorro || LINEAR || — || align=right | 2.2 km || 
|-id=772 bgcolor=#E9E9E9
| 217772 ||  || — || September 3, 2000 || Socorro || LINEAR || — || align=right | 4.1 km || 
|-id=773 bgcolor=#E9E9E9
| 217773 ||  || — || September 4, 2000 || Socorro || LINEAR || IAN || align=right | 2.5 km || 
|-id=774 bgcolor=#E9E9E9
| 217774 ||  || — || September 4, 2000 || Socorro || LINEAR || JUN || align=right | 2.8 km || 
|-id=775 bgcolor=#E9E9E9
| 217775 ||  || — || September 1, 2000 || Socorro || LINEAR || — || align=right | 5.4 km || 
|-id=776 bgcolor=#E9E9E9
| 217776 ||  || — || September 7, 2000 || Kitt Peak || Spacewatch || WIT || align=right | 1.4 km || 
|-id=777 bgcolor=#E9E9E9
| 217777 ||  || — || September 23, 2000 || Socorro || LINEAR || — || align=right | 3.5 km || 
|-id=778 bgcolor=#E9E9E9
| 217778 ||  || — || September 23, 2000 || Socorro || LINEAR || — || align=right | 3.9 km || 
|-id=779 bgcolor=#E9E9E9
| 217779 ||  || — || September 23, 2000 || Socorro || LINEAR || — || align=right | 3.7 km || 
|-id=780 bgcolor=#E9E9E9
| 217780 ||  || — || September 24, 2000 || Socorro || LINEAR || — || align=right | 3.3 km || 
|-id=781 bgcolor=#E9E9E9
| 217781 ||  || — || September 24, 2000 || Socorro || LINEAR || — || align=right | 4.1 km || 
|-id=782 bgcolor=#E9E9E9
| 217782 ||  || — || September 24, 2000 || Socorro || LINEAR || — || align=right | 2.6 km || 
|-id=783 bgcolor=#E9E9E9
| 217783 ||  || — || September 24, 2000 || Socorro || LINEAR || — || align=right | 3.2 km || 
|-id=784 bgcolor=#E9E9E9
| 217784 ||  || — || September 23, 2000 || Socorro || LINEAR || — || align=right | 4.0 km || 
|-id=785 bgcolor=#E9E9E9
| 217785 ||  || — || September 24, 2000 || Socorro || LINEAR || — || align=right | 3.2 km || 
|-id=786 bgcolor=#E9E9E9
| 217786 ||  || — || September 24, 2000 || Socorro || LINEAR || — || align=right | 3.7 km || 
|-id=787 bgcolor=#E9E9E9
| 217787 ||  || — || September 25, 2000 || Socorro || LINEAR || — || align=right | 2.7 km || 
|-id=788 bgcolor=#E9E9E9
| 217788 ||  || — || September 25, 2000 || Socorro || LINEAR || — || align=right | 5.3 km || 
|-id=789 bgcolor=#E9E9E9
| 217789 ||  || — || September 23, 2000 || Socorro || LINEAR || — || align=right | 3.5 km || 
|-id=790 bgcolor=#E9E9E9
| 217790 ||  || — || September 28, 2000 || Socorro || LINEAR || — || align=right | 3.7 km || 
|-id=791 bgcolor=#E9E9E9
| 217791 ||  || — || September 27, 2000 || Socorro || LINEAR || — || align=right | 4.7 km || 
|-id=792 bgcolor=#E9E9E9
| 217792 ||  || — || September 30, 2000 || Anderson Mesa || LONEOS || — || align=right | 4.1 km || 
|-id=793 bgcolor=#E9E9E9
| 217793 ||  || — || October 1, 2000 || Socorro || LINEAR || — || align=right | 3.9 km || 
|-id=794 bgcolor=#E9E9E9
| 217794 ||  || — || October 1, 2000 || Socorro || LINEAR || — || align=right | 4.3 km || 
|-id=795 bgcolor=#E9E9E9
| 217795 ||  || — || October 1, 2000 || Anderson Mesa || LONEOS || AGN || align=right | 1.7 km || 
|-id=796 bgcolor=#FFC2E0
| 217796 ||  || — || October 7, 2000 || Anderson Mesa || LONEOS || AMO +1km || align=right | 1.4 km || 
|-id=797 bgcolor=#E9E9E9
| 217797 ||  || — || October 24, 2000 || Socorro || LINEAR || — || align=right | 3.4 km || 
|-id=798 bgcolor=#E9E9E9
| 217798 ||  || — || October 25, 2000 || Socorro || LINEAR || — || align=right | 4.1 km || 
|-id=799 bgcolor=#E9E9E9
| 217799 ||  || — || October 25, 2000 || Socorro || LINEAR || — || align=right | 4.7 km || 
|-id=800 bgcolor=#E9E9E9
| 217800 ||  || — || October 25, 2000 || Socorro || LINEAR || — || align=right | 3.7 km || 
|}

217801–217900 

|-bgcolor=#E9E9E9
| 217801 ||  || — || October 25, 2000 || Socorro || LINEAR || — || align=right | 4.6 km || 
|-id=802 bgcolor=#d6d6d6
| 217802 ||  || — || October 25, 2000 || Socorro || LINEAR || SAN || align=right | 2.4 km || 
|-id=803 bgcolor=#E9E9E9
| 217803 ||  || — || November 20, 2000 || Socorro || LINEAR || — || align=right | 4.7 km || 
|-id=804 bgcolor=#d6d6d6
| 217804 ||  || — || November 20, 2000 || Socorro || LINEAR || — || align=right | 4.4 km || 
|-id=805 bgcolor=#E9E9E9
| 217805 ||  || — || December 1, 2000 || Socorro || LINEAR || CLO || align=right | 3.9 km || 
|-id=806 bgcolor=#E9E9E9
| 217806 ||  || — || December 5, 2000 || Socorro || LINEAR || MAR || align=right | 2.1 km || 
|-id=807 bgcolor=#FFC2E0
| 217807 ||  || — || December 5, 2000 || Socorro || LINEAR || AMO +1km || align=right data-sort-value="0.83" | 830 m || 
|-id=808 bgcolor=#fefefe
| 217808 ||  || — || December 30, 2000 || Socorro || LINEAR || — || align=right | 1.2 km || 
|-id=809 bgcolor=#d6d6d6
| 217809 ||  || — || December 30, 2000 || Socorro || LINEAR || — || align=right | 4.8 km || 
|-id=810 bgcolor=#d6d6d6
| 217810 ||  || — || December 29, 2000 || Haleakala || NEAT || — || align=right | 4.4 km || 
|-id=811 bgcolor=#d6d6d6
| 217811 ||  || — || January 4, 2001 || Haleakala || NEAT || URS || align=right | 5.7 km || 
|-id=812 bgcolor=#d6d6d6
| 217812 ||  || — || January 4, 2001 || Socorro || LINEAR || — || align=right | 4.6 km || 
|-id=813 bgcolor=#fefefe
| 217813 ||  || — || January 19, 2001 || Socorro || LINEAR || FLO || align=right | 1.1 km || 
|-id=814 bgcolor=#d6d6d6
| 217814 ||  || — || January 21, 2001 || Socorro || LINEAR || — || align=right | 4.5 km || 
|-id=815 bgcolor=#d6d6d6
| 217815 ||  || — || January 18, 2001 || Haleakala || NEAT || EOS || align=right | 3.6 km || 
|-id=816 bgcolor=#fefefe
| 217816 ||  || — || February 19, 2001 || Socorro || LINEAR || PHO || align=right | 1.9 km || 
|-id=817 bgcolor=#d6d6d6
| 217817 ||  || — || February 19, 2001 || Socorro || LINEAR || EOS || align=right | 3.4 km || 
|-id=818 bgcolor=#d6d6d6
| 217818 ||  || — || February 19, 2001 || Socorro || LINEAR || EOS || align=right | 2.9 km || 
|-id=819 bgcolor=#d6d6d6
| 217819 ||  || — || February 19, 2001 || Socorro || LINEAR || — || align=right | 5.0 km || 
|-id=820 bgcolor=#d6d6d6
| 217820 ||  || — || February 19, 2001 || Socorro || LINEAR || — || align=right | 5.7 km || 
|-id=821 bgcolor=#fefefe
| 217821 ||  || — || February 22, 2001 || Kitt Peak || Spacewatch || FLO || align=right | 1.1 km || 
|-id=822 bgcolor=#fefefe
| 217822 ||  || — || March 18, 2001 || Socorro || LINEAR || ERI || align=right | 2.5 km || 
|-id=823 bgcolor=#fefefe
| 217823 ||  || — || March 19, 2001 || Socorro || LINEAR || FLO || align=right data-sort-value="0.94" | 940 m || 
|-id=824 bgcolor=#fefefe
| 217824 ||  || — || March 19, 2001 || Socorro || LINEAR || ERI || align=right | 3.1 km || 
|-id=825 bgcolor=#fefefe
| 217825 ||  || — || March 26, 2001 || Kitt Peak || Spacewatch || NYS || align=right data-sort-value="0.88" | 880 m || 
|-id=826 bgcolor=#d6d6d6
| 217826 ||  || — || March 28, 2001 || Kitt Peak || Spacewatch || — || align=right | 4.7 km || 
|-id=827 bgcolor=#fefefe
| 217827 ||  || — || March 16, 2001 || Socorro || LINEAR || — || align=right | 1.4 km || 
|-id=828 bgcolor=#fefefe
| 217828 || 2001 GT || — || April 13, 2001 || Socorro || LINEAR || — || align=right | 2.1 km || 
|-id=829 bgcolor=#fefefe
| 217829 ||  || — || April 26, 2001 || Socorro || LINEAR || H || align=right | 1.0 km || 
|-id=830 bgcolor=#fefefe
| 217830 ||  || — || April 18, 2001 || Haleakala || NEAT || — || align=right | 1.3 km || 
|-id=831 bgcolor=#fefefe
| 217831 ||  || — || May 15, 2001 || Haleakala || NEAT || MAS || align=right | 1.1 km || 
|-id=832 bgcolor=#fefefe
| 217832 ||  || — || May 17, 2001 || Socorro || LINEAR || — || align=right | 1.4 km || 
|-id=833 bgcolor=#fefefe
| 217833 ||  || — || May 23, 2001 || Ondřejov || P. Pravec, P. Kušnirák || NYS || align=right data-sort-value="0.86" | 860 m || 
|-id=834 bgcolor=#fefefe
| 217834 ||  || — || May 18, 2001 || Socorro || LINEAR || NYS || align=right data-sort-value="0.92" | 920 m || 
|-id=835 bgcolor=#fefefe
| 217835 ||  || — || May 23, 2001 || Socorro || LINEAR || CIM || align=right | 3.3 km || 
|-id=836 bgcolor=#fefefe
| 217836 ||  || — || May 30, 2001 || Socorro || LINEAR || H || align=right | 1.0 km || 
|-id=837 bgcolor=#FFC2E0
| 217837 || 2001 LC || — || June 1, 2001 || Socorro || LINEAR || APO || align=right data-sort-value="0.51" | 510 m || 
|-id=838 bgcolor=#E9E9E9
| 217838 ||  || — || June 15, 2001 || Palomar || NEAT || — || align=right | 2.3 km || 
|-id=839 bgcolor=#fefefe
| 217839 ||  || — || July 20, 2001 || Palomar || NEAT || H || align=right | 1.4 km || 
|-id=840 bgcolor=#E9E9E9
| 217840 ||  || — || July 20, 2001 || Socorro || LINEAR || — || align=right | 2.0 km || 
|-id=841 bgcolor=#fefefe
| 217841 ||  || — || July 16, 2001 || Anderson Mesa || LONEOS || — || align=right | 1.6 km || 
|-id=842 bgcolor=#fefefe
| 217842 ||  || — || July 23, 2001 || Palomar || NEAT || H || align=right data-sort-value="0.86" | 860 m || 
|-id=843 bgcolor=#fefefe
| 217843 ||  || — || July 20, 2001 || Palomar || NEAT || — || align=right | 1.3 km || 
|-id=844 bgcolor=#d6d6d6
| 217844 ||  || — || July 24, 2001 || Palomar || NEAT || 3:2 || align=right | 7.1 km || 
|-id=845 bgcolor=#E9E9E9
| 217845 ||  || — || July 20, 2001 || Anderson Mesa || LONEOS || — || align=right | 1.4 km || 
|-id=846 bgcolor=#E9E9E9
| 217846 ||  || — || July 16, 2001 || Anderson Mesa || LONEOS || KON || align=right | 3.9 km || 
|-id=847 bgcolor=#E9E9E9
| 217847 ||  || — || August 11, 2001 || Palomar || NEAT || — || align=right | 1.7 km || 
|-id=848 bgcolor=#d6d6d6
| 217848 ||  || — || August 14, 2001 || Haleakala || NEAT || 3:2 || align=right | 6.5 km || 
|-id=849 bgcolor=#d6d6d6
| 217849 ||  || — || August 14, 2001 || Haleakala || NEAT || 3:2 || align=right | 5.6 km || 
|-id=850 bgcolor=#E9E9E9
| 217850 ||  || — || August 13, 2001 || Palomar || NEAT || — || align=right | 1.3 km || 
|-id=851 bgcolor=#fefefe
| 217851 ||  || — || August 16, 2001 || Socorro || LINEAR || H || align=right | 1.0 km || 
|-id=852 bgcolor=#E9E9E9
| 217852 ||  || — || August 16, 2001 || Socorro || LINEAR || — || align=right | 1.4 km || 
|-id=853 bgcolor=#d6d6d6
| 217853 ||  || — || August 16, 2001 || Socorro || LINEAR || 3:2 || align=right | 8.3 km || 
|-id=854 bgcolor=#E9E9E9
| 217854 ||  || — || August 16, 2001 || Socorro || LINEAR || — || align=right | 1.8 km || 
|-id=855 bgcolor=#E9E9E9
| 217855 ||  || — || August 17, 2001 || Socorro || LINEAR || — || align=right | 1.6 km || 
|-id=856 bgcolor=#fefefe
| 217856 ||  || — || August 17, 2001 || Palomar || NEAT || H || align=right data-sort-value="0.86" | 860 m || 
|-id=857 bgcolor=#fefefe
| 217857 ||  || — || August 22, 2001 || Socorro || LINEAR || H || align=right data-sort-value="0.92" | 920 m || 
|-id=858 bgcolor=#fefefe
| 217858 ||  || — || August 19, 2001 || Socorro || LINEAR || — || align=right | 1.4 km || 
|-id=859 bgcolor=#E9E9E9
| 217859 ||  || — || August 17, 2001 || Socorro || LINEAR || — || align=right | 1.4 km || 
|-id=860 bgcolor=#E9E9E9
| 217860 ||  || — || August 17, 2001 || Socorro || LINEAR || — || align=right | 1.8 km || 
|-id=861 bgcolor=#E9E9E9
| 217861 ||  || — || August 20, 2001 || Socorro || LINEAR || — || align=right | 1.6 km || 
|-id=862 bgcolor=#fefefe
| 217862 ||  || — || August 20, 2001 || Socorro || LINEAR || H || align=right data-sort-value="0.92" | 920 m || 
|-id=863 bgcolor=#fefefe
| 217863 ||  || — || August 21, 2001 || Socorro || LINEAR || H || align=right data-sort-value="0.95" | 950 m || 
|-id=864 bgcolor=#E9E9E9
| 217864 ||  || — || August 22, 2001 || Socorro || LINEAR || — || align=right | 3.0 km || 
|-id=865 bgcolor=#E9E9E9
| 217865 ||  || — || August 22, 2001 || Socorro || LINEAR || MIT || align=right | 4.4 km || 
|-id=866 bgcolor=#E9E9E9
| 217866 ||  || — || August 24, 2001 || Socorro || LINEAR || — || align=right | 2.5 km || 
|-id=867 bgcolor=#fefefe
| 217867 ||  || — || August 23, 2001 || Socorro || LINEAR || H || align=right | 1.5 km || 
|-id=868 bgcolor=#E9E9E9
| 217868 ||  || — || August 26, 2001 || Ondřejov || P. Kušnirák || — || align=right | 1.3 km || 
|-id=869 bgcolor=#E9E9E9
| 217869 ||  || — || August 23, 2001 || Anderson Mesa || LONEOS || — || align=right | 1.4 km || 
|-id=870 bgcolor=#E9E9E9
| 217870 ||  || — || August 22, 2001 || Socorro || LINEAR || BRU || align=right | 4.2 km || 
|-id=871 bgcolor=#E9E9E9
| 217871 ||  || — || August 22, 2001 || Goodricke-Pigott || R. A. Tucker || — || align=right | 2.1 km || 
|-id=872 bgcolor=#E9E9E9
| 217872 ||  || — || August 22, 2001 || Socorro || LINEAR || — || align=right | 1.8 km || 
|-id=873 bgcolor=#E9E9E9
| 217873 ||  || — || August 23, 2001 || Anderson Mesa || LONEOS || — || align=right data-sort-value="0.98" | 980 m || 
|-id=874 bgcolor=#E9E9E9
| 217874 ||  || — || August 23, 2001 || Anderson Mesa || LONEOS || — || align=right | 3.2 km || 
|-id=875 bgcolor=#E9E9E9
| 217875 ||  || — || August 23, 2001 || Socorro || LINEAR || EUN || align=right | 2.3 km || 
|-id=876 bgcolor=#E9E9E9
| 217876 ||  || — || August 24, 2001 || Anderson Mesa || LONEOS || — || align=right | 1.6 km || 
|-id=877 bgcolor=#d6d6d6
| 217877 ||  || — || August 24, 2001 || Anderson Mesa || LONEOS || 3:2 || align=right | 11 km || 
|-id=878 bgcolor=#E9E9E9
| 217878 ||  || — || August 24, 2001 || Socorro || LINEAR || — || align=right | 1.3 km || 
|-id=879 bgcolor=#E9E9E9
| 217879 ||  || — || August 24, 2001 || Socorro || LINEAR || — || align=right | 1.8 km || 
|-id=880 bgcolor=#fefefe
| 217880 ||  || — || August 19, 2001 || Socorro || LINEAR || H || align=right data-sort-value="0.83" | 830 m || 
|-id=881 bgcolor=#E9E9E9
| 217881 ||  || — || August 23, 2001 || Goodricke-Pigott || R. A. Tucker || — || align=right | 1.8 km || 
|-id=882 bgcolor=#E9E9E9
| 217882 ||  || — || August 16, 2001 || Palomar || NEAT || — || align=right | 1.4 km || 
|-id=883 bgcolor=#E9E9E9
| 217883 ||  || — || August 24, 2001 || Socorro || LINEAR || — || align=right | 3.3 km || 
|-id=884 bgcolor=#E9E9E9
| 217884 ||  || — || September 11, 2001 || Socorro || LINEAR || EUN || align=right | 1.4 km || 
|-id=885 bgcolor=#E9E9E9
| 217885 ||  || — || September 10, 2001 || Socorro || LINEAR || KON || align=right | 4.4 km || 
|-id=886 bgcolor=#E9E9E9
| 217886 ||  || — || September 11, 2001 || Anderson Mesa || LONEOS || — || align=right | 1.3 km || 
|-id=887 bgcolor=#E9E9E9
| 217887 ||  || — || September 11, 2001 || Anderson Mesa || LONEOS || — || align=right | 1.7 km || 
|-id=888 bgcolor=#fefefe
| 217888 ||  || — || September 11, 2001 || Anderson Mesa || LONEOS || MAS || align=right | 1.2 km || 
|-id=889 bgcolor=#E9E9E9
| 217889 ||  || — || September 7, 2001 || Socorro || LINEAR || — || align=right | 1.3 km || 
|-id=890 bgcolor=#E9E9E9
| 217890 ||  || — || September 12, 2001 || Socorro || LINEAR || — || align=right | 1.7 km || 
|-id=891 bgcolor=#d6d6d6
| 217891 ||  || — || September 12, 2001 || Socorro || LINEAR || SHU3:2 || align=right | 8.6 km || 
|-id=892 bgcolor=#E9E9E9
| 217892 ||  || — || September 12, 2001 || Socorro || LINEAR || — || align=right | 1.4 km || 
|-id=893 bgcolor=#E9E9E9
| 217893 ||  || — || September 12, 2001 || Socorro || LINEAR || — || align=right | 1.3 km || 
|-id=894 bgcolor=#E9E9E9
| 217894 ||  || — || September 15, 2001 || Palomar || NEAT || RAF || align=right | 1.3 km || 
|-id=895 bgcolor=#E9E9E9
| 217895 ||  || — || September 11, 2001 || Anderson Mesa || LONEOS || MAR || align=right | 1.7 km || 
|-id=896 bgcolor=#E9E9E9
| 217896 ||  || — || September 16, 2001 || Socorro || LINEAR || — || align=right | 1.3 km || 
|-id=897 bgcolor=#E9E9E9
| 217897 ||  || — || September 16, 2001 || Socorro || LINEAR || — || align=right | 1.9 km || 
|-id=898 bgcolor=#E9E9E9
| 217898 ||  || — || September 16, 2001 || Socorro || LINEAR || — || align=right | 1.3 km || 
|-id=899 bgcolor=#E9E9E9
| 217899 ||  || — || September 16, 2001 || Socorro || LINEAR || — || align=right | 1.3 km || 
|-id=900 bgcolor=#E9E9E9
| 217900 ||  || — || September 17, 2001 || Socorro || LINEAR || — || align=right | 1.0 km || 
|}

217901–218000 

|-bgcolor=#E9E9E9
| 217901 ||  || — || September 17, 2001 || Socorro || LINEAR || — || align=right | 1.4 km || 
|-id=902 bgcolor=#fefefe
| 217902 ||  || — || September 18, 2001 || Socorro || LINEAR || H || align=right | 1.3 km || 
|-id=903 bgcolor=#E9E9E9
| 217903 ||  || — || September 20, 2001 || Socorro || LINEAR || — || align=right | 1.4 km || 
|-id=904 bgcolor=#E9E9E9
| 217904 ||  || — || September 20, 2001 || Socorro || LINEAR || EUN || align=right | 1.9 km || 
|-id=905 bgcolor=#E9E9E9
| 217905 ||  || — || September 20, 2001 || Socorro || LINEAR || — || align=right | 3.9 km || 
|-id=906 bgcolor=#d6d6d6
| 217906 ||  || — || September 16, 2001 || Socorro || LINEAR || 3:2 || align=right | 8.2 km || 
|-id=907 bgcolor=#E9E9E9
| 217907 ||  || — || September 16, 2001 || Socorro || LINEAR || — || align=right | 1.7 km || 
|-id=908 bgcolor=#E9E9E9
| 217908 ||  || — || September 16, 2001 || Socorro || LINEAR || — || align=right | 1.0 km || 
|-id=909 bgcolor=#E9E9E9
| 217909 ||  || — || September 17, 2001 || Socorro || LINEAR || — || align=right | 1.3 km || 
|-id=910 bgcolor=#E9E9E9
| 217910 ||  || — || September 17, 2001 || Socorro || LINEAR || — || align=right | 1.7 km || 
|-id=911 bgcolor=#fefefe
| 217911 ||  || — || September 16, 2001 || Socorro || LINEAR || FLO || align=right data-sort-value="0.91" | 910 m || 
|-id=912 bgcolor=#E9E9E9
| 217912 ||  || — || September 17, 2001 || Socorro || LINEAR || KON || align=right | 3.3 km || 
|-id=913 bgcolor=#E9E9E9
| 217913 ||  || — || September 19, 2001 || Socorro || LINEAR || — || align=right | 1.2 km || 
|-id=914 bgcolor=#E9E9E9
| 217914 ||  || — || September 19, 2001 || Socorro || LINEAR || — || align=right | 1.1 km || 
|-id=915 bgcolor=#E9E9E9
| 217915 ||  || — || September 19, 2001 || Socorro || LINEAR || — || align=right | 1.2 km || 
|-id=916 bgcolor=#E9E9E9
| 217916 ||  || — || September 20, 2001 || Socorro || LINEAR || KON || align=right | 3.3 km || 
|-id=917 bgcolor=#E9E9E9
| 217917 ||  || — || September 21, 2001 || Socorro || LINEAR || — || align=right | 1.8 km || 
|-id=918 bgcolor=#E9E9E9
| 217918 ||  || — || September 25, 2001 || Socorro || LINEAR || EUN || align=right | 2.0 km || 
|-id=919 bgcolor=#E9E9E9
| 217919 ||  || — || September 25, 2001 || Socorro || LINEAR || MIT || align=right | 4.5 km || 
|-id=920 bgcolor=#E9E9E9
| 217920 ||  || — || September 25, 2001 || Socorro || LINEAR || EUN || align=right | 2.1 km || 
|-id=921 bgcolor=#E9E9E9
| 217921 ||  || — || September 16, 2001 || Socorro || LINEAR || — || align=right | 1.2 km || 
|-id=922 bgcolor=#fefefe
| 217922 ||  || — || September 21, 2001 || Palomar || NEAT || H || align=right data-sort-value="0.73" | 730 m || 
|-id=923 bgcolor=#E9E9E9
| 217923 ||  || — || September 23, 2001 || Haleakala || NEAT || — || align=right | 2.0 km || 
|-id=924 bgcolor=#E9E9E9
| 217924 || 2001 TK || — || October 6, 2001 || Palomar || NEAT || — || align=right | 1.1 km || 
|-id=925 bgcolor=#E9E9E9
| 217925 ||  || — || October 7, 2001 || Palomar || NEAT || — || align=right | 1.3 km || 
|-id=926 bgcolor=#E9E9E9
| 217926 ||  || — || October 10, 2001 || Palomar || NEAT || — || align=right | 1.3 km || 
|-id=927 bgcolor=#E9E9E9
| 217927 ||  || — || October 12, 2001 || Goodricke-Pigott || R. A. Tucker || — || align=right | 2.7 km || 
|-id=928 bgcolor=#E9E9E9
| 217928 ||  || — || October 11, 2001 || Socorro || LINEAR || — || align=right | 1.4 km || 
|-id=929 bgcolor=#E9E9E9
| 217929 ||  || — || October 13, 2001 || Socorro || LINEAR || — || align=right | 1.6 km || 
|-id=930 bgcolor=#E9E9E9
| 217930 ||  || — || October 14, 2001 || Socorro || LINEAR || — || align=right | 1.4 km || 
|-id=931 bgcolor=#E9E9E9
| 217931 ||  || — || October 14, 2001 || Socorro || LINEAR || — || align=right | 3.9 km || 
|-id=932 bgcolor=#E9E9E9
| 217932 ||  || — || October 15, 2001 || Desert Eagle || W. K. Y. Yeung || — || align=right | 1.3 km || 
|-id=933 bgcolor=#E9E9E9
| 217933 ||  || — || October 13, 2001 || Socorro || LINEAR || — || align=right | 1.6 km || 
|-id=934 bgcolor=#E9E9E9
| 217934 ||  || — || October 13, 2001 || Socorro || LINEAR || — || align=right | 2.1 km || 
|-id=935 bgcolor=#fefefe
| 217935 ||  || — || October 13, 2001 || Socorro || LINEAR || H || align=right data-sort-value="0.87" | 870 m || 
|-id=936 bgcolor=#E9E9E9
| 217936 ||  || — || October 14, 2001 || Socorro || LINEAR || — || align=right | 1.6 km || 
|-id=937 bgcolor=#E9E9E9
| 217937 ||  || — || October 13, 2001 || Socorro || LINEAR || — || align=right | 2.4 km || 
|-id=938 bgcolor=#E9E9E9
| 217938 ||  || — || October 13, 2001 || Socorro || LINEAR || — || align=right | 2.6 km || 
|-id=939 bgcolor=#E9E9E9
| 217939 ||  || — || October 12, 2001 || Haleakala || NEAT || — || align=right | 1.7 km || 
|-id=940 bgcolor=#E9E9E9
| 217940 ||  || — || October 12, 2001 || Haleakala || NEAT || — || align=right | 1.9 km || 
|-id=941 bgcolor=#E9E9E9
| 217941 ||  || — || October 10, 2001 || Palomar || NEAT || — || align=right | 1.3 km || 
|-id=942 bgcolor=#E9E9E9
| 217942 ||  || — || October 10, 2001 || Palomar || NEAT || — || align=right | 1.6 km || 
|-id=943 bgcolor=#E9E9E9
| 217943 ||  || — || October 14, 2001 || Socorro || LINEAR || — || align=right | 1.6 km || 
|-id=944 bgcolor=#E9E9E9
| 217944 ||  || — || October 13, 2001 || Palomar || NEAT || MAR || align=right | 1.7 km || 
|-id=945 bgcolor=#E9E9E9
| 217945 ||  || — || October 13, 2001 || Palomar || NEAT || GER || align=right | 2.2 km || 
|-id=946 bgcolor=#E9E9E9
| 217946 ||  || — || October 14, 2001 || Socorro || LINEAR || — || align=right | 1.2 km || 
|-id=947 bgcolor=#E9E9E9
| 217947 ||  || — || October 15, 2001 || Palomar || NEAT || — || align=right | 1.6 km || 
|-id=948 bgcolor=#E9E9E9
| 217948 ||  || — || October 15, 2001 || Socorro || LINEAR || — || align=right | 1.8 km || 
|-id=949 bgcolor=#E9E9E9
| 217949 ||  || — || October 21, 2001 || Desert Eagle || W. K. Y. Yeung || — || align=right | 1.8 km || 
|-id=950 bgcolor=#E9E9E9
| 217950 ||  || — || October 25, 2001 || Desert Eagle || W. K. Y. Yeung || — || align=right | 2.1 km || 
|-id=951 bgcolor=#fefefe
| 217951 ||  || — || October 18, 2001 || Socorro || LINEAR || — || align=right | 1.4 km || 
|-id=952 bgcolor=#E9E9E9
| 217952 ||  || — || October 16, 2001 || Socorro || LINEAR || — || align=right | 1.4 km || 
|-id=953 bgcolor=#E9E9E9
| 217953 ||  || — || October 17, 2001 || Socorro || LINEAR || — || align=right | 1.4 km || 
|-id=954 bgcolor=#E9E9E9
| 217954 ||  || — || October 17, 2001 || Socorro || LINEAR || — || align=right | 1.3 km || 
|-id=955 bgcolor=#E9E9E9
| 217955 ||  || — || October 20, 2001 || Socorro || LINEAR || — || align=right | 1.7 km || 
|-id=956 bgcolor=#E9E9E9
| 217956 ||  || — || October 20, 2001 || Socorro || LINEAR || — || align=right | 1.5 km || 
|-id=957 bgcolor=#E9E9E9
| 217957 ||  || — || October 20, 2001 || Socorro || LINEAR || ADE || align=right | 2.4 km || 
|-id=958 bgcolor=#E9E9E9
| 217958 ||  || — || October 23, 2001 || Socorro || LINEAR || — || align=right | 1.2 km || 
|-id=959 bgcolor=#E9E9E9
| 217959 ||  || — || October 23, 2001 || Socorro || LINEAR || — || align=right | 2.5 km || 
|-id=960 bgcolor=#E9E9E9
| 217960 ||  || — || October 23, 2001 || Socorro || LINEAR || — || align=right | 2.1 km || 
|-id=961 bgcolor=#E9E9E9
| 217961 ||  || — || October 19, 2001 || Socorro || LINEAR || — || align=right | 2.5 km || 
|-id=962 bgcolor=#E9E9E9
| 217962 ||  || — || October 18, 2001 || Socorro || LINEAR || — || align=right | 2.2 km || 
|-id=963 bgcolor=#E9E9E9
| 217963 ||  || — || October 19, 2001 || Palomar || NEAT || — || align=right | 1.9 km || 
|-id=964 bgcolor=#E9E9E9
| 217964 ||  || — || October 22, 2001 || Socorro || LINEAR || — || align=right | 1.3 km || 
|-id=965 bgcolor=#E9E9E9
| 217965 ||  || — || October 23, 2001 || Socorro || LINEAR || — || align=right | 2.4 km || 
|-id=966 bgcolor=#E9E9E9
| 217966 ||  || — || November 10, 2001 || Socorro || LINEAR || MAR || align=right | 2.2 km || 
|-id=967 bgcolor=#E9E9E9
| 217967 ||  || — || November 9, 2001 || Socorro || LINEAR || — || align=right | 1.5 km || 
|-id=968 bgcolor=#E9E9E9
| 217968 ||  || — || November 9, 2001 || Socorro || LINEAR || — || align=right | 1.4 km || 
|-id=969 bgcolor=#E9E9E9
| 217969 ||  || — || November 9, 2001 || Socorro || LINEAR || — || align=right | 1.6 km || 
|-id=970 bgcolor=#E9E9E9
| 217970 ||  || — || November 9, 2001 || Socorro || LINEAR || — || align=right | 2.0 km || 
|-id=971 bgcolor=#E9E9E9
| 217971 ||  || — || November 9, 2001 || Socorro || LINEAR || — || align=right | 5.4 km || 
|-id=972 bgcolor=#E9E9E9
| 217972 ||  || — || November 9, 2001 || Socorro || LINEAR || EUN || align=right | 2.3 km || 
|-id=973 bgcolor=#E9E9E9
| 217973 ||  || — || November 9, 2001 || Socorro || LINEAR || — || align=right | 2.8 km || 
|-id=974 bgcolor=#E9E9E9
| 217974 ||  || — || November 9, 2001 || Socorro || LINEAR || — || align=right | 1.8 km || 
|-id=975 bgcolor=#E9E9E9
| 217975 ||  || — || November 9, 2001 || Socorro || LINEAR || MAR || align=right | 2.2 km || 
|-id=976 bgcolor=#E9E9E9
| 217976 ||  || — || November 9, 2001 || Socorro || LINEAR || — || align=right | 2.4 km || 
|-id=977 bgcolor=#E9E9E9
| 217977 ||  || — || November 10, 2001 || Socorro || LINEAR || — || align=right | 1.4 km || 
|-id=978 bgcolor=#E9E9E9
| 217978 ||  || — || November 12, 2001 || Kitt Peak || Spacewatch || — || align=right | 2.3 km || 
|-id=979 bgcolor=#E9E9E9
| 217979 ||  || — || November 15, 2001 || Haleakala || NEAT || — || align=right | 4.9 km || 
|-id=980 bgcolor=#E9E9E9
| 217980 ||  || — || November 12, 2001 || Socorro || LINEAR || MAR || align=right | 1.6 km || 
|-id=981 bgcolor=#E9E9E9
| 217981 ||  || — || November 15, 2001 || Palomar || NEAT || EUN || align=right | 1.7 km || 
|-id=982 bgcolor=#E9E9E9
| 217982 ||  || — || November 15, 2001 || Socorro || LINEAR || — || align=right | 3.0 km || 
|-id=983 bgcolor=#E9E9E9
| 217983 ||  || — || November 15, 2001 || Socorro || LINEAR || — || align=right | 2.5 km || 
|-id=984 bgcolor=#E9E9E9
| 217984 ||  || — || November 12, 2001 || Socorro || LINEAR || MAR || align=right | 1.7 km || 
|-id=985 bgcolor=#E9E9E9
| 217985 ||  || — || November 12, 2001 || Socorro || LINEAR || MAR || align=right | 2.0 km || 
|-id=986 bgcolor=#E9E9E9
| 217986 ||  || — || November 9, 2001 || Socorro || LINEAR || — || align=right | 2.3 km || 
|-id=987 bgcolor=#E9E9E9
| 217987 ||  || — || November 11, 2001 || Apache Point || SDSS || — || align=right | 2.7 km || 
|-id=988 bgcolor=#E9E9E9
| 217988 ||  || — || November 17, 2001 || Socorro || LINEAR || — || align=right | 3.0 km || 
|-id=989 bgcolor=#E9E9E9
| 217989 ||  || — || November 19, 2001 || Socorro || LINEAR || — || align=right | 2.1 km || 
|-id=990 bgcolor=#E9E9E9
| 217990 ||  || — || November 19, 2001 || Socorro || LINEAR || — || align=right | 1.8 km || 
|-id=991 bgcolor=#d6d6d6
| 217991 ||  || — || November 19, 2001 || Socorro || LINEAR || HIL3:2 || align=right | 7.3 km || 
|-id=992 bgcolor=#E9E9E9
| 217992 ||  || — || November 19, 2001 || Socorro || LINEAR || PAD || align=right | 2.8 km || 
|-id=993 bgcolor=#E9E9E9
| 217993 ||  || — || November 20, 2001 || Socorro || LINEAR || WIT || align=right | 1.3 km || 
|-id=994 bgcolor=#E9E9E9
| 217994 ||  || — || November 24, 2001 || Socorro || LINEAR || — || align=right | 2.3 km || 
|-id=995 bgcolor=#E9E9E9
| 217995 ||  || — || November 24, 2001 || Socorro || LINEAR || — || align=right | 3.1 km || 
|-id=996 bgcolor=#E9E9E9
| 217996 ||  || — || December 9, 2001 || Socorro || LINEAR || JUN || align=right | 2.0 km || 
|-id=997 bgcolor=#E9E9E9
| 217997 ||  || — || December 9, 2001 || Socorro || LINEAR || RAF || align=right | 1.9 km || 
|-id=998 bgcolor=#E9E9E9
| 217998 ||  || — || December 9, 2001 || Socorro || LINEAR || — || align=right | 2.8 km || 
|-id=999 bgcolor=#E9E9E9
| 217999 ||  || — || December 11, 2001 || Socorro || LINEAR || EUN || align=right | 2.0 km || 
|-id=000 bgcolor=#E9E9E9
| 218000 ||  || — || December 11, 2001 || Socorro || LINEAR || — || align=right | 1.9 km || 
|}

References

External links 
 Discovery Circumstances: Numbered Minor Planets (215001)–(220000) (IAU Minor Planet Center)

0217